= List of Puerto Ricans =

Flag of Puerto Rico

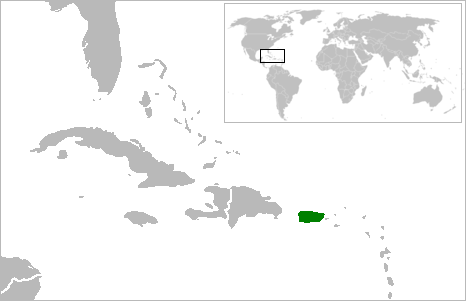
Location of Puerto Rico

This is a list of notable people from Puerto Rico which includes people who were born in Puerto Rico (Borinquen) and people who are of full or partial Puerto Rican descent. Puerto Rican citizens are included, as the government of Puerto Rico has been issuing "Certificates of Puerto Rican Citizenship" to anyone born in Puerto Rico or to anyone born outside of Puerto Rico with at least one parent who was born in Puerto Rico since 2007. Also included in the list are some long-term continental American and other residents or immigrants of other ethnic heritages who have made Puerto Rico their home and consider themselves to be Puerto Ricans.

The list is divided into categories and, in some cases, sub-categories, which best describe the field for which the subject is most noted. Some categories such as "Actors, actresses, comedians and directors" are relative since a subject who is a comedian may also be an actor or director. In some cases a subject may be notable in more than one field, such as Luis A. Ferré, who is notable both as a former governor and as an industrialist. However, the custom is to place the subject's name under the category for which the subject is most noted.

== Actors, actresses, comedians and directors ==
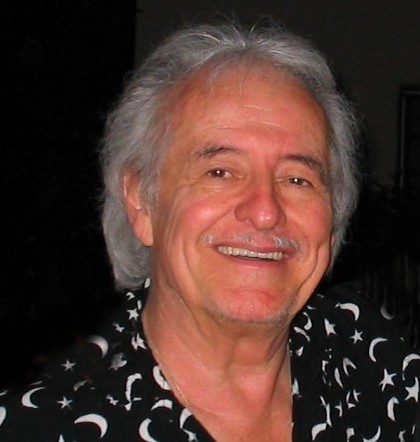
Henry Darrow

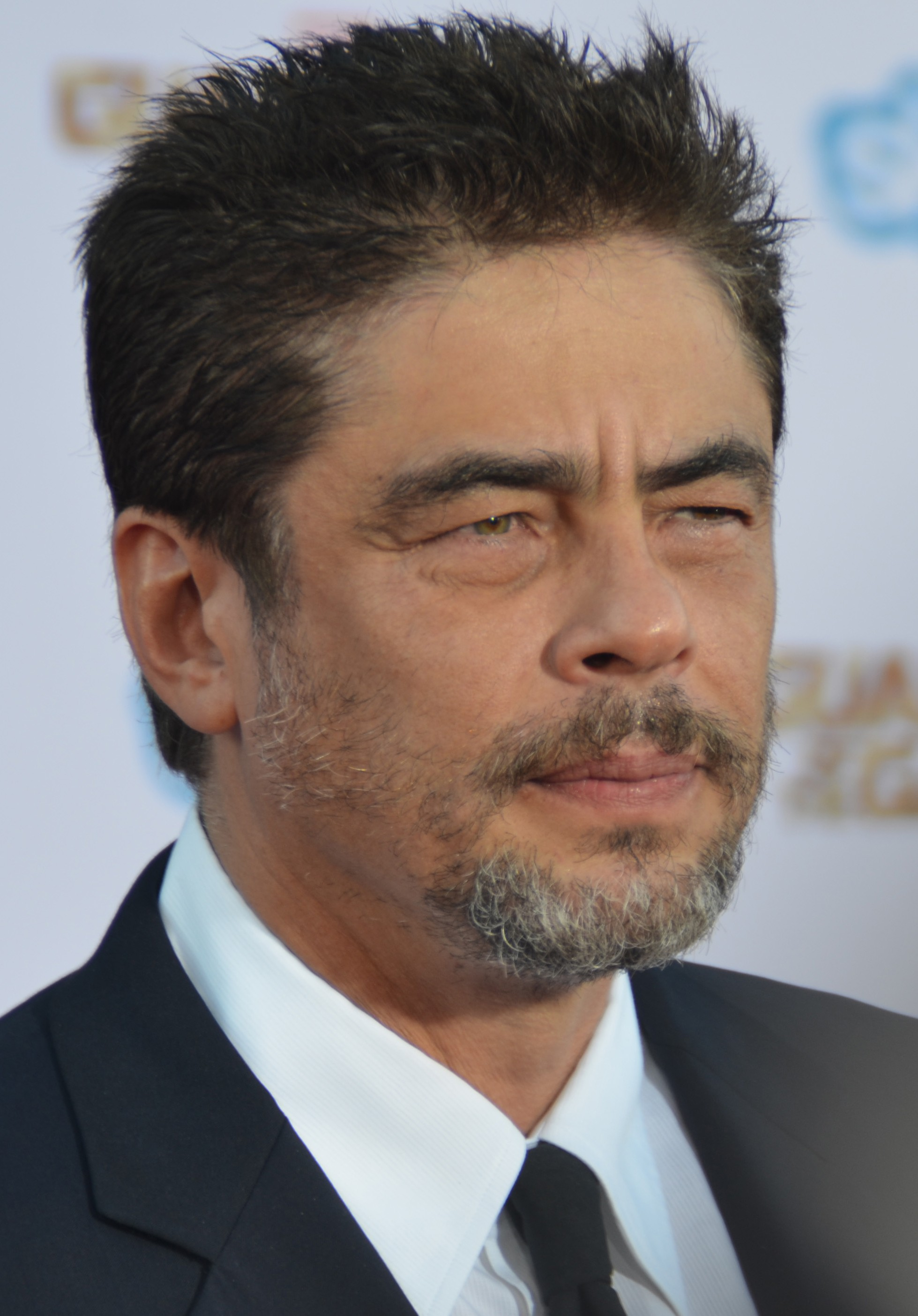
Benicio del Toro

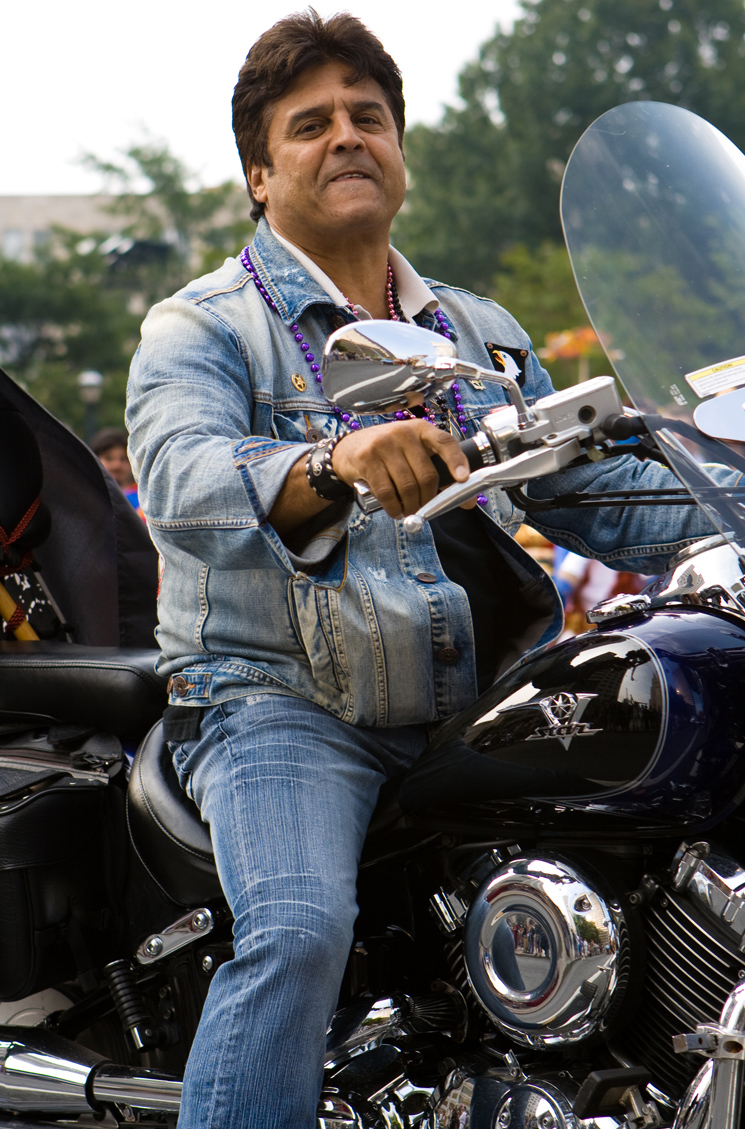
Erik Estrada

José Ferrer

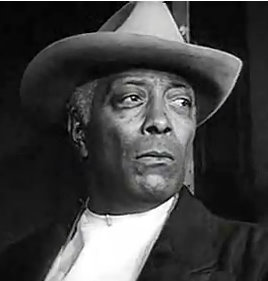
Juano Hernández

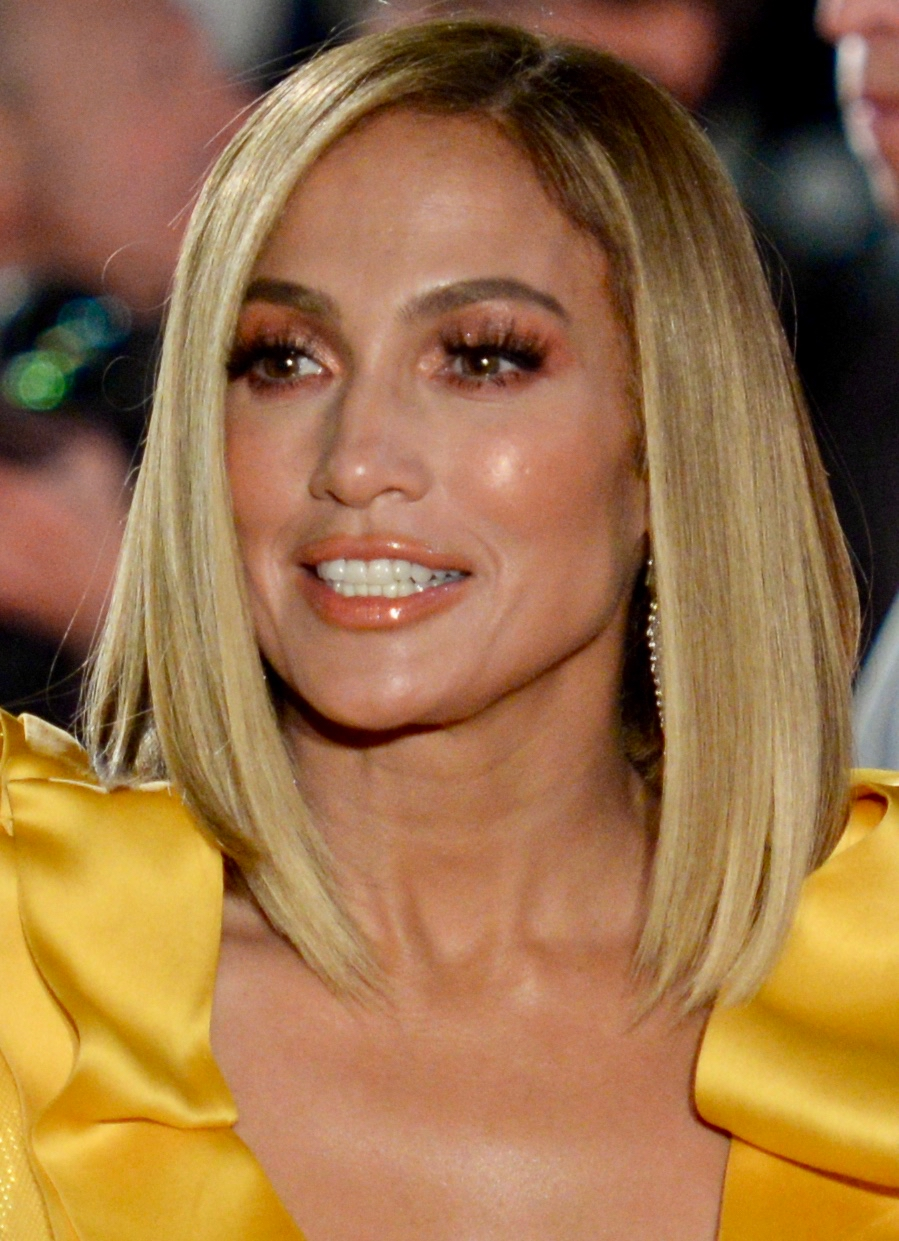
Jennifer Lopez

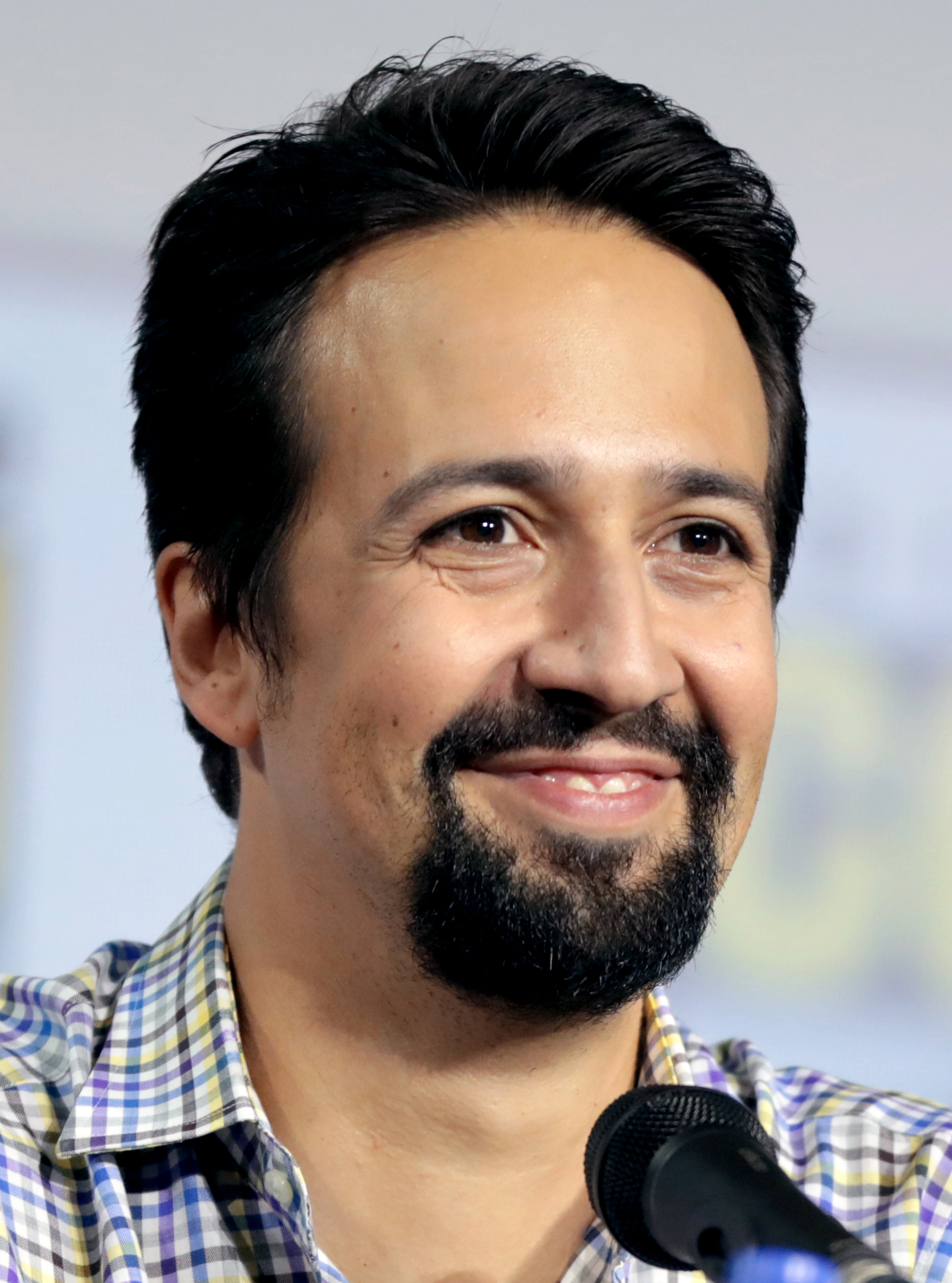
Lin-Manuel Miranda

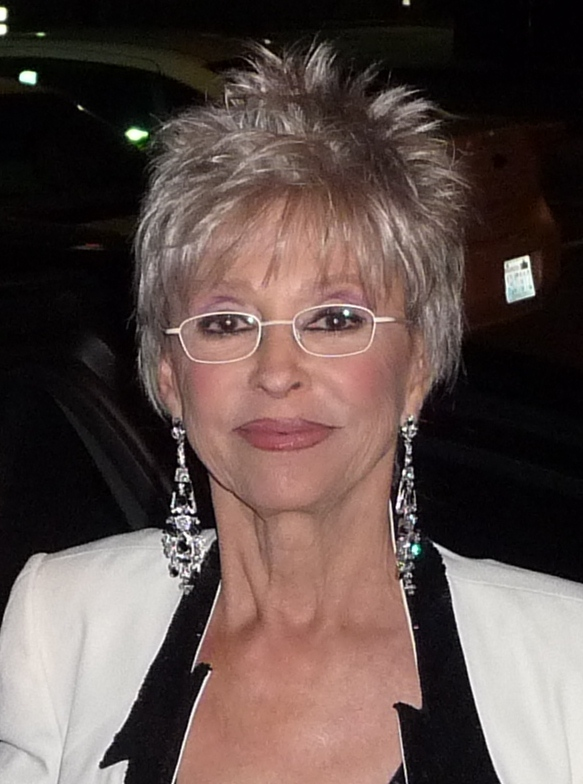
Rita Moreno

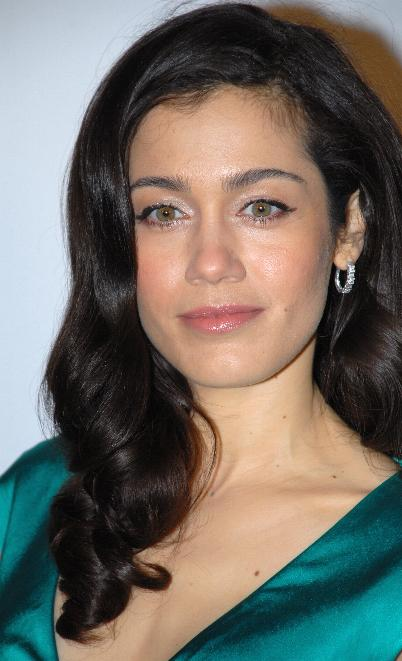
Lymari Nadal

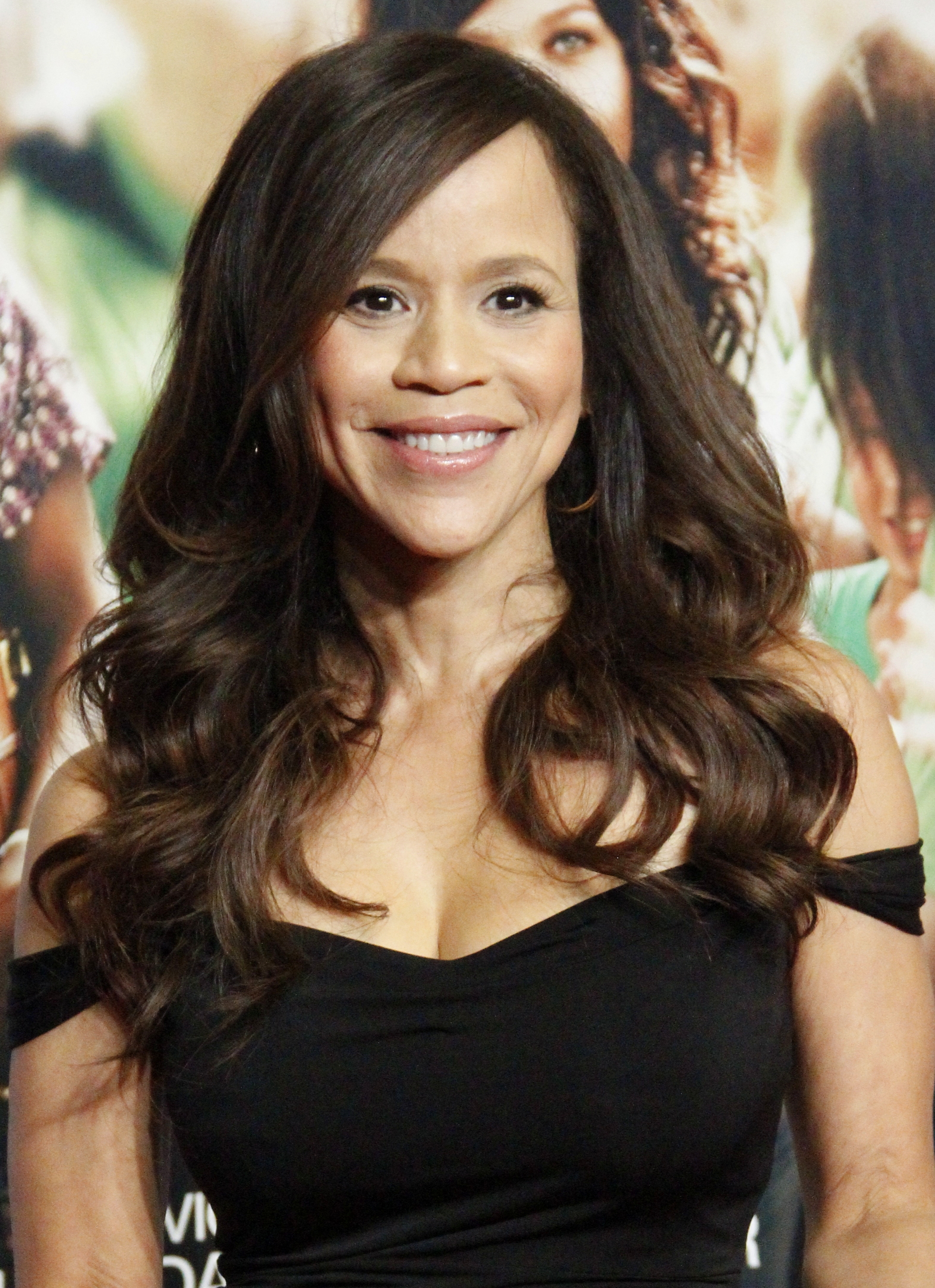
Rosie Perez

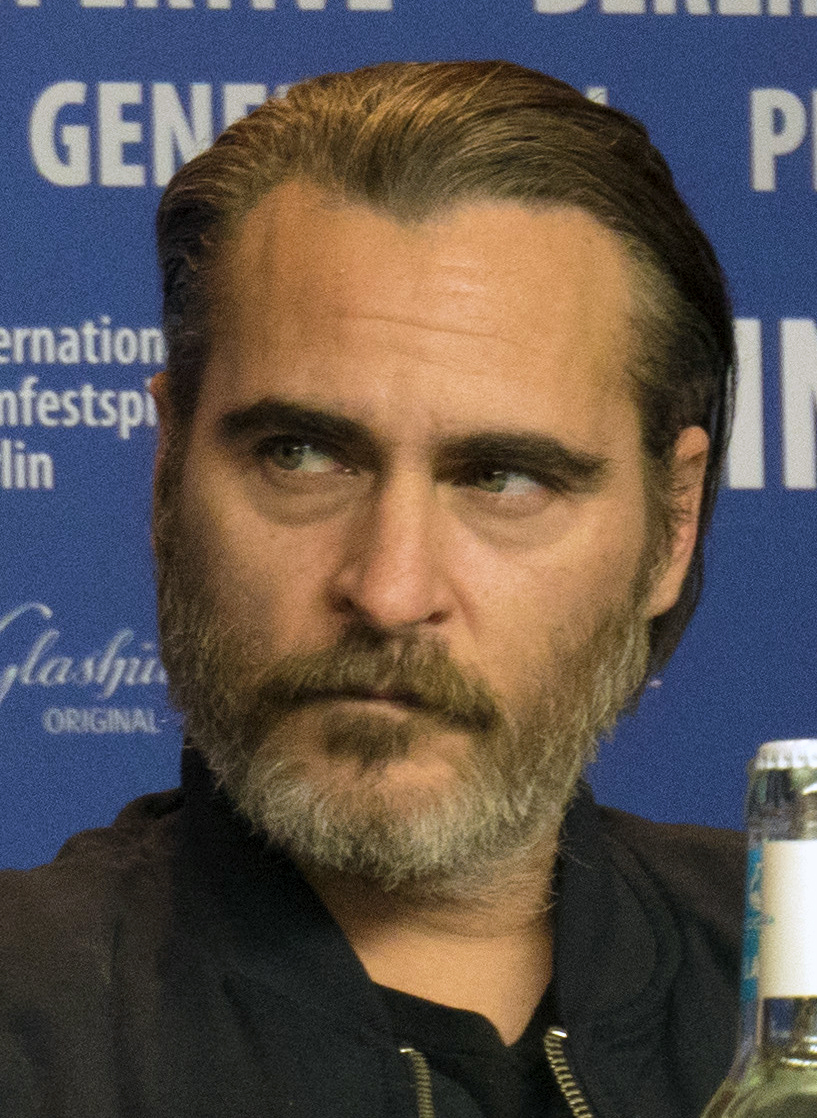
Joaquin Phoenix

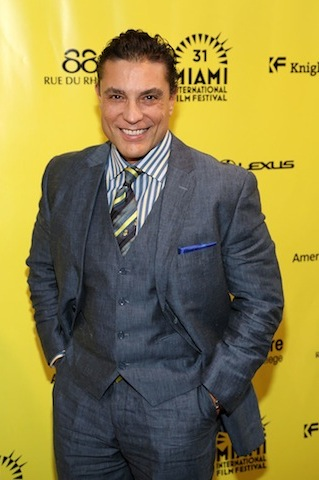
Osvaldo Ríos

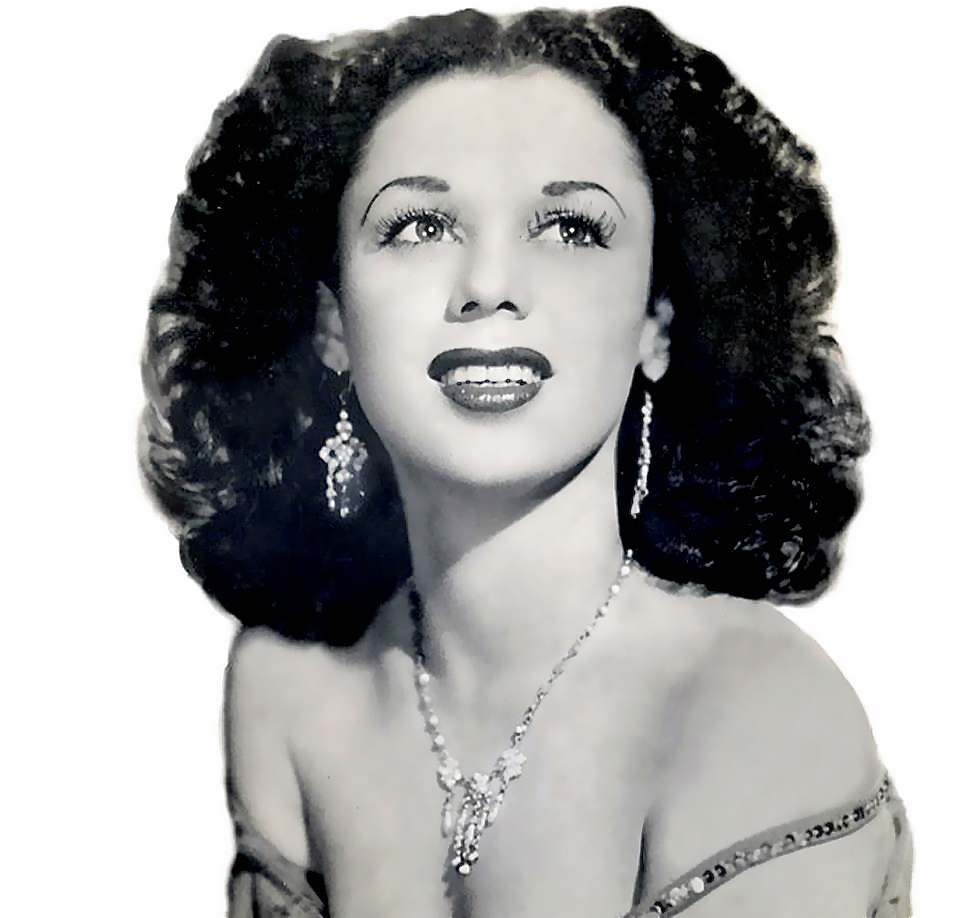
Marquita Rivera

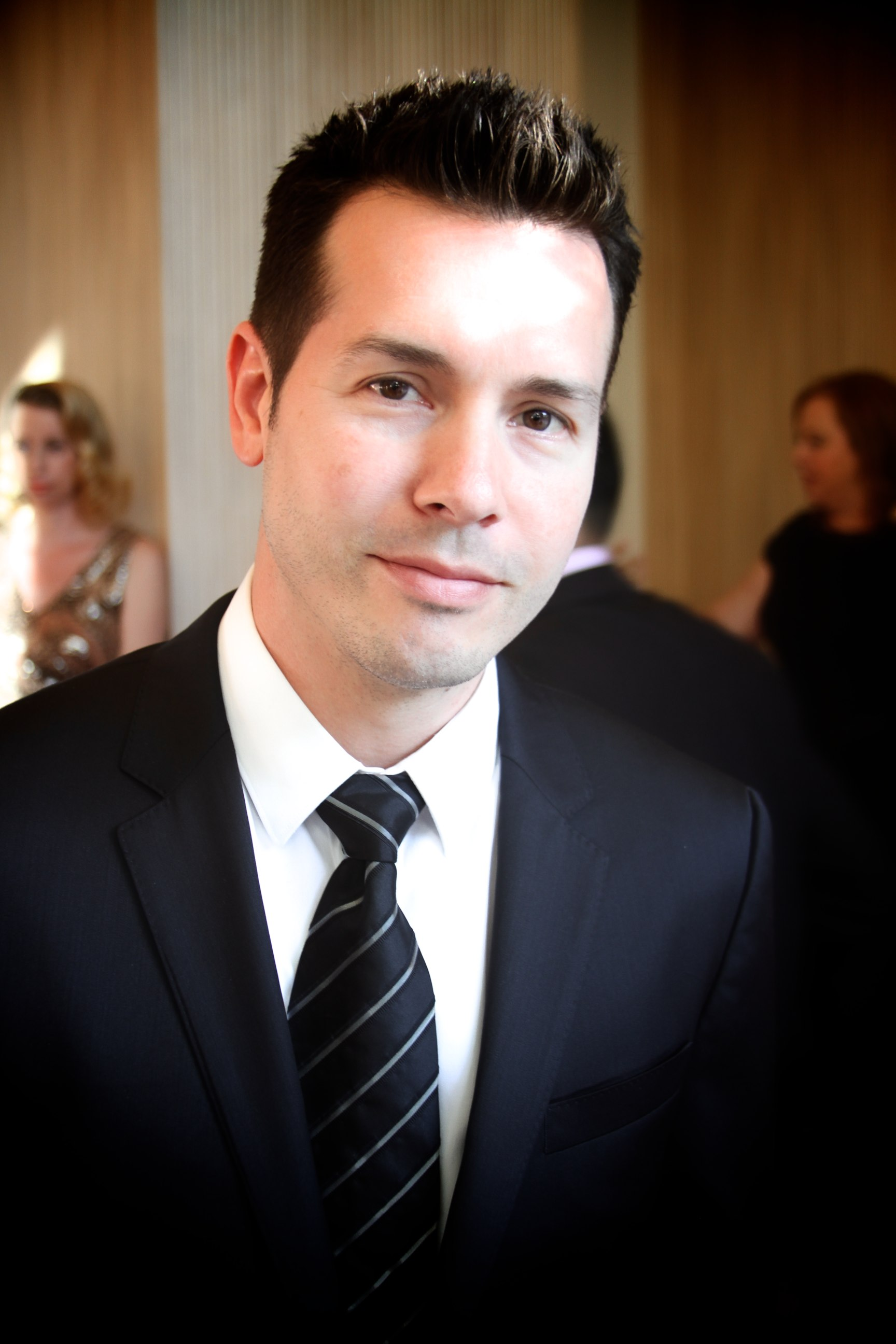
Jon Seda

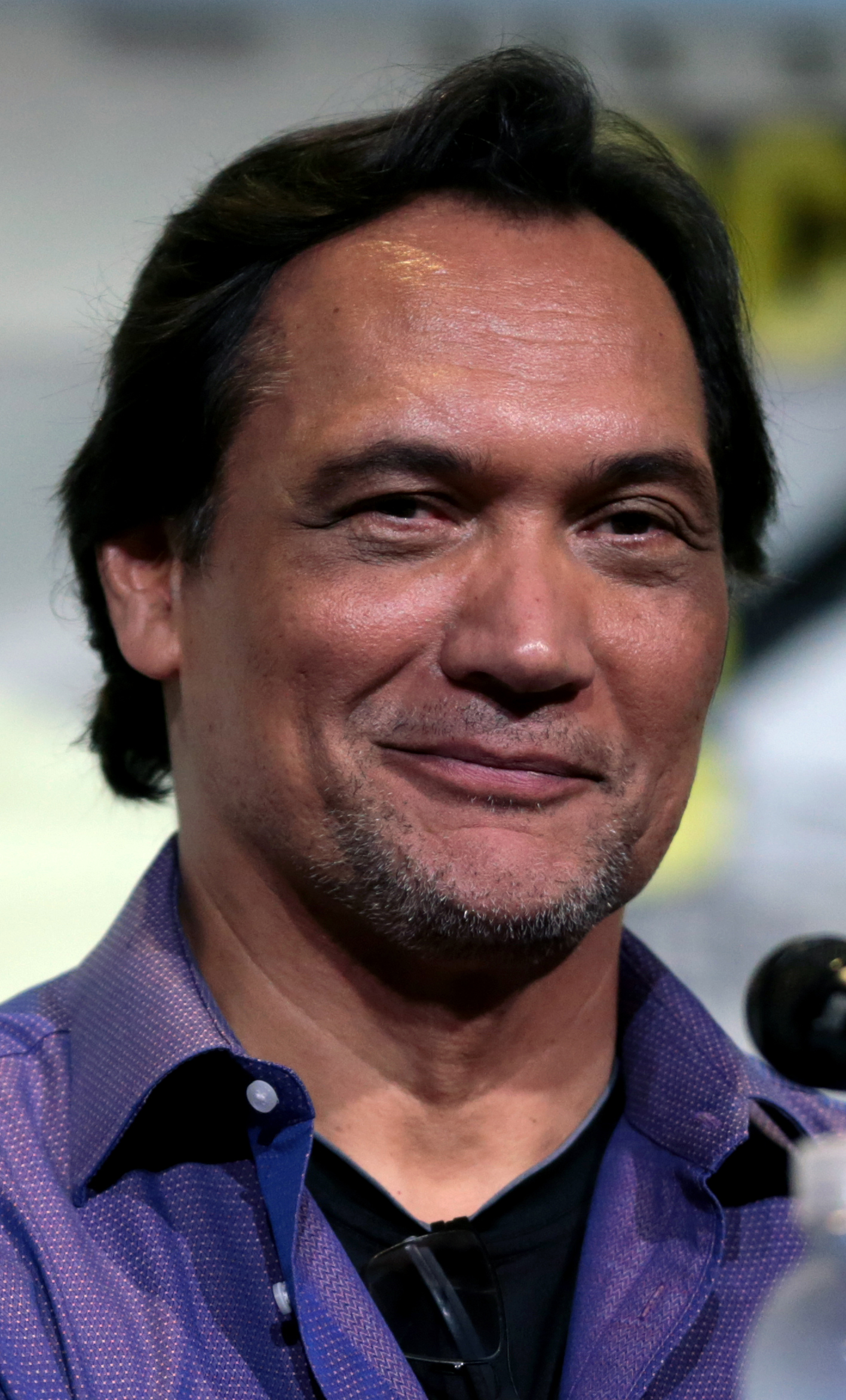
Jimmy Smits

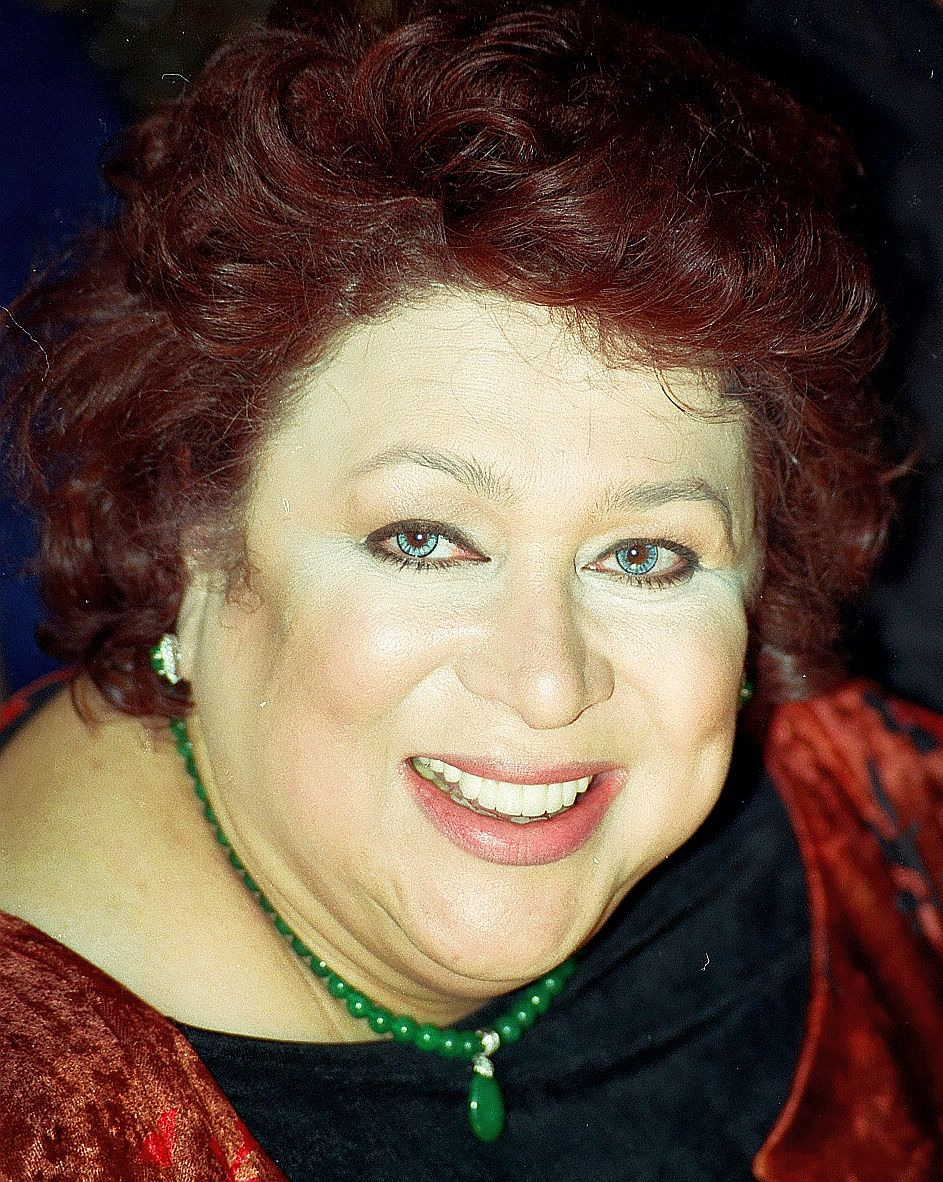
Liz Torres

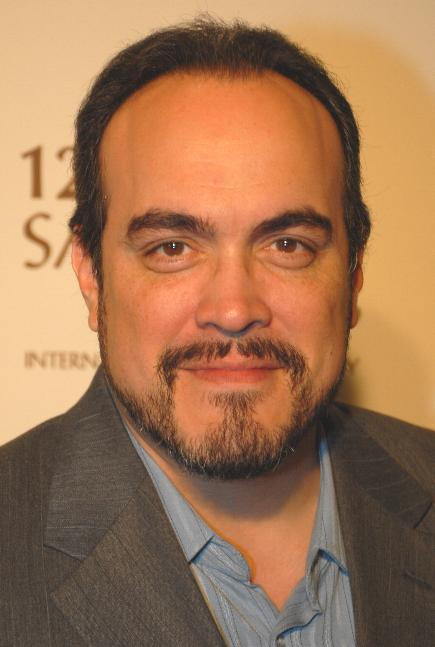
David Zayas

=== A ===
- Kirk Acevedo (born 1971)
- José Miguel Agrelot (1927–2004), a.k.a. "Don Cholito", comedian
- Jorge Alberti (born 1977), actor
- Miguel Angel Alvarez (1928–2011), actor and comedian
- Joe Elvis Alway (born 1969), Nuyorican actor, dancer, playwright, director, nonprofit founder
- La La Anthony (born 1982), actress, MTV VJ
- Marc Anthony (born 1968), singer and actor
- Víctor Argo (1934–2004), actor
- Adria Arjona (born 1992), actress
- Raymond Arrieta (born 1965), comedian and television host
- Miguel Arteta (born 1965), film/television director
- Robert Avellanet (born 1975), singer, actor, songwriter and producer
- Rick Avilés (1952–1995), actor and comedian
- Amanda Ayala (born 1997), singer

=== B ===
- Ivonne Belén (born 1955), documentary director and producer
- Eddie Blazquez (1974), musician, author and director
- Giselle Blondet (born 1966), actress and television host
- Diego Boneta (born 1990), actor, singer-songwriter (Puerto Rican grandfather)
- Desmin Borges, actor
- Lucy Boscana (1915–2001), television and theatrical actress
- Bad Bunny (born 1994), rapper, singer and actor

=== C ===
- Norma Candal (1930–2006), actress and comedian
- Ernesto Caro (born 1994), real estate agent and investor, founder of Caromar Group
- Irene Cara (1959–2022), actress and singer (Puerto Rican father)
- Awilda Carbia (1938–2009), actress and comedian
- Raulito Carbonell (born 1951), actor and comedian
- Braulio Castillo (1933–2015), actor
- Braulio Castillo, hijo (born 1958), actor
- David Castro (born 1996), actor (Puerto Rican father)
- Raquel Castro (born 1994), actress (Puerto Rican father)
- Melwin Cedeño (born 1964), comedian
- Iris Chacón (born 1950), singer and dancer
- Abdiel Colberg (born 1957), film director and television producer
- Ivonne Coll (born 1947), actress
- Liza Colón-Zayas (born 1972), actress and playwright
- Míriam Colón (1936–2017), actress and founder of the Puerto Rican Traveling Theatre
- Paquito Cordero (1932–2009), comedian and television producer
- Kevin Corrigan (born 1969), actor
- Mapita Cortés (1939–2006), actress
- Mapy Cortés (1910–1998), actress
- Luis Antonio Cosme, actor, singer, musician, writer and cook
- Auliʻi Cravalho (born 2000), actress and singer
- Mara Croatto (born 1969), actress
- Ismael Cruz Córdova (born 1987), actor
- Monique Gabriela Curnen (born 1970), film and television actress

=== D ===
- Daddy Yankee (born 1977), musician, rapper, singer, entrepreneur
- Dagmar (born 1955), actress, singer and television host
- Henry Darrow (1933–2021), actor
- Raúl Dávila (1931–2006), actor
- Sammy Davis Jr. (1925–1990), singer, dancer, actor, comedian, film producer and television director (Puerto Rican mother)
- Rosario Dawson (born 1979), actress
- Blanca de Castejón (1906–1969), actress
- Kamar de los Reyes (1967–2023), actor
- Joey Dedio (born 1963), actor, writer, producer
- Benicio del Toro (born 1967), Academy Award-winning actor
- Sylvia del Villard (1928–1990), actress, choreographer and dancer
- Idalis DeLeón (born 1969), actress, former MTV VJ, singer (Seduction)
- Michael DeLorenzo (born 1959), actor
- Alba Nydia Díaz (born 1955), actress
- Melonie Díaz (born 1984), actress

=== E ===
- Lydia Echevarría (born 1931), actress (convicted for her role in the death of producer Luis Vigoreaux)
- Héctor Elizondo (born 1936), actor
- Nashali Enchautegui (born 1970), actor,singer,dancer
- Richard Esteras (born 1968), actor (Puerto Rican father)
- Erik Estrada (born 1949), actor

=== F ===
- Antonio Fargas (born 1946), actor
- José Ferrer (1912–1992), first Hispanic actor to win an Academy Award
- Miguel Ferrer (1955–2017), actor
- Luz Odilia Font (1929–2022), actress

=== G ===
- Gloria Garayúa (born 1978), actress
- Julián Gil (born 1970), television and film actor, model
- Joyce Giraud (born 1975), actress, former Miss Puerto Rico Universe titleholder
- Reagan Gómez-Preston (born 1980), actress
- Rick González (born 1979), actor
- Meagan Good (born 1981), actress
- Javier Grillo Marxuach (born 1969), television and film producer
- Luis Guzmán (born 1956), actor
- Luis Roberto Guzmán (born 1973), television and film actor

=== H ===
- Juano Hernández (1896–1970), actor
- Jon Huertas (born 1976), actor; played Brad Alcerro in Sabrina the Teenage Witch
- Lillian Hurst (born 1943), comedian, actress (television series Dharma and Greg)

=== I ===
- Ironmouse, VTuber
- Vincent Irizarry, actor (Puerto Rican father)

=== J ===
- Jeremy de León (born 2004) Athlete (Puerto Rican Father)
- Shar Jackson (born 1976), actress/singer (Puerto Rican father)
- Raul Julia (1940–1995), actor
- Victoria Justice (born 1993), singer, television actress (Victorious) (Puerto Rican mother)
- Luis Jiménez (born 1970) Radio personality creator of El Vacilon de la Manana NYC, Film actor, Voice over talent and voice actor

=== L ===
- Eva LaRue (born 1966), actress
- Steve Lemme (born 1968), actor and comedian (Puerto Rican mother)
- Sunshine Logroño (born 1951), comedian
- Adamari López (born 1971), actress
- Jennifer López (born 1969), singer, actress, and dancer
- Priscilla López (born 1948), actress, singer, and dancer
- Juan Luis (1940–2011), 3rd Governor and Lieutenant Governor of the U.S. Virgin Islands

=== M ===
- Justina Machado (born 1972), actress
- Tere Marichal (born 1956), actress, writer, Maria Chuzema
- Eddie Marrero (born 1962), actor, singer
- Gregori J. Martin (born 1978) director, writer, producer
- Ricky Martin (born 1971), singer, actor
- Tony Martínez (1920–2002), actor, singer, and bandleader; played Pepino Garcia in The Real McCoys television series
- Alexis Mateo (born 1979), female impersonator, reality television personality
- Claribel Medina (born 1959), actress
- Maritza Medina (born 1967), actress
- Von Marie Mendez (born 1950), actress and businesswoman
- Walter Mercado (1932–2019), astrologer, dancer, telenovela actor, writer
- Jorge Merced (born 1965), theatre actor and director
- Ángela Meyer (born 1947), actress, comedian and producer
- Ari Meyers (born 1969), actress
- Elsa Miranda (1922–2007), vocalist, actress who was featured internationally on the Viva America radio program
- Lin-Manuel Miranda (born 1980), actor, composer, rapper and writer, best known for creating and starring in the Broadway musicals Hamilton and In the Heights; has won a Pulitzer Prize, two Grammys, an Emmy, a MacArthur "Genius" Award, and three Tony awards
- René Monclova (born 1965), actor and comedian
- Mario Montez (1935–2013), female impersonator; actor; member of Warhol superstars
- Esaí Morales (born 1962), actor
- Jacobo Morales (born 1934), comedian, director, and actor
- Alicia Moreda (1912–1983), actress, comedian
- Rita Moreno (born 1931), actress, first Hispanic woman to win the following four major awards: an Oscar, a Tony Award, an Emmy Award and a Grammy Award
- Frankie Muñiz (born 1985), actor (Puerto Rican father)
- Rafo Muñiz (born 1956), comedian and producer
- Tommy Muñiz (1922–2009), television producer, comedian

=== N ===
- Frances Negrón Muntaner (born 1966), filmmaker, writer, and scholar
- Micaela Nevárez (born 1972), actress; first Puerto Rican to win a Goya Award
- Amaury Nolasco (born 1970), actor
- Christian Navarro (born 1991), actor

=== O ===
- Luis Oliva (born 1951), actor, comedian and mime
- Tony Oliver (born 1958), voice actor
- Karen Olivo (born 1976), actress (Puerto Rican father); winner of 2009 Tony Award for Best Featured Actress
- Elín Ortiz (1934–2016), actor, television producer
- Shalim Ortiz (born 1979), singer and actor (Puerto Rican father)
- Jaina Lee Ortiz (born 1986), actress and dancer

=== P ===
- Marian Pabón (born 1957), actress, singer and comedian
- Antonio Pantojas (1948–2017), drag queen
- Lana Parrilla (born 1977), actress (Puerto Rican father)
- Rosie Pérez (born 1964), actress
- Joaquin Phoenix (born 1974), actor
- Aubrey Plaza (born 1984), actress (Puerto Rican father)
- Freddie Prinze (1954–1977), comedian, actor (Puerto Rican mother)
- Freddie Prinze Jr. (born 1976), actor (Puerto Rican grandmother)

=== Q ===
- Ivy Queen (born 1972), singer, lyricist, rapper, musician, fashion icon; one of the early founders and creators of the reggaeton style
- Adolfo Quiñones (1955–2020), actor, dancer, choreographer

=== R ===
- Carmen Belén Richardson (1930–2012), comedian/actress
- Armando Riesco (born 1977), actor
- Michelle Rios (born 1965), actress and singer
- Osvaldo Ríos (born 1960), actor and singer
- Chita Rivera (1933–2024), actress, singer and dancer; winner of two Tony Awards
- José Rivera (born 1955), playwright; first Puerto Rican nominated for an Oscar in "Best Adapted Screenplay" category
- Luis Antonio Rivera (1930–2023), a.k.a. "Yoyo Boing", comedian
- Marquita Rivera (1922–2002), first Puerto Rican actress to appear in a major Hollywood motion picture
- Naya Rivera (1987–2020), actress (Puerto Rican father)
- Ramón Rivero (1909–1956), also known as "Diplo", comedian; organized the world's first known Walk-A-Thon in 1953
- Adalberto Rodríguez (1934–1995), a.k.a. "Machuchal", comedian
- Adam Rodríguez (born 1975), actor
- Freddy Rodríguez (born 1975), actor
- Gina Rodríguez (born 1984), actress
- Gladys Rodríguez (born 1943), comedian, actress
- Jai Rodríguez (born 1979), television personality (Queer Eye for the Straight Guy)
- Michelle Rodriguez (born 1978), actress
- Marta Romero (1928–2013), actress and singer
- Robi "Draco" Rosa (born 1970), singer
- Johanna Rosaly (born 1948), actress

=== S ===
- Zoe Saldaña (born 1978), actress (Puerto Rican mother)
- Olga San Juan (1927–2009), film actress and dancer
- Jaime Sánchez (born 1938), actor (musical West Side Story, film The Wild Bunch)
- Roselyn Sánchez (born 1973), actress
- Esther Sandoval (1927–2006), actress
- Jon Seda (born 1970), actor
- Jimmy Smits (born 1955), actor (Puerto Rican mother)
- Luis F. Soto, director
- Talisa Soto (born 1967), actress, model
- Miguel Ángel Suárez (1939–2009), actor, playwright, stage director
- Mason Santos (born 2014), student

=== T ===
- Rachel Ticotin (born 1958), actress
- Liz Torres (born 1947), actress
- Rose Troche (born 1964), film/television director

=== U ===
- Alanna Ubach (born 1975), actress (Puerto Rican mother)

=== V ===
- Amirah Vann (born 1978), actress (Puerto Rican mother)
- John Velazquez (born 1971), Champion jockey, leading money-earning jockey in the history of horse racing and inducted into Racing Hall of Fame in 2012.
- Nadine Velázquez (born 1978), actress
- Lauren Vélez (born 1964), actress
- Loraine Vélez (born 1964), actress
- Christina Vidal (born 1981), actress and singer
- Lisa Vidal (born 1965), actress
- Juan Emilio Viguié (1891–1966), pioneer movie producer; produced Romance Tropical, the first Puerto Rican film with sound

=== W ===
- Otilio Warrington (born 1944), also known as "Bizcocho", comedian
- Holly Woodlawn (1946–2015), transgender actress and Warhol superstar

=== Z ===
- David Zayas (born 1962), actor
- Marcos Zurinaga (born 1952), film director/screenwriter

=== Adult film entertainers ===
- Mercedes Carrera (born 1982), adult film actress and blogger
- Vanessa del Río (born 1952), adult film actress
- Gina Lynn (born 1974), adult film actress

=== Hosts/presenters ===
- Paul Bouche (born 1970), television host, TV producer, A Oscuras Pero Encendidos
- Mairym Monti Carlo (born 1975), television host, chef
- Alfred D. Herger (born 1942), television host, psychologist
- Daisy Martínez, host of PBS cooking show Daisy Cooks!
- John Meléndez (born 1965), once known as "Stuttering John" (Howard Stern Show and The Tonight Show with Jay Leno)
- Eddie Miró (1935–2024), television host, comedian; hosted El Show de las 12 (The 12 pm Show) for over 40 years
- Silverio Pérez (born 1948), show host, musician and author
- Antonio Sánchez (born 1961), radio and television personality
- Alani Vázquez (born 1981), also known as "La La"; MTV veejay
- Luis Vigoreaux (1928–1983), created ¡Sube, Nene, Sube! (Go up, Man, Go up!) and ¡Pa'rriba, Papi, Pa'rriba! (Higher, Daddy, Higher!)
- Luisito Vigoreaux (born 1951), hosted Sábado en Grande (Big Saturday, also with Roberto), El Show del Mediodía (The Midday Show) and De Magazin
- Roberto Vigoreaux (born 1956), hosted Parejo, Doble y Triple (Square, Double and Triple)

== Architects ==
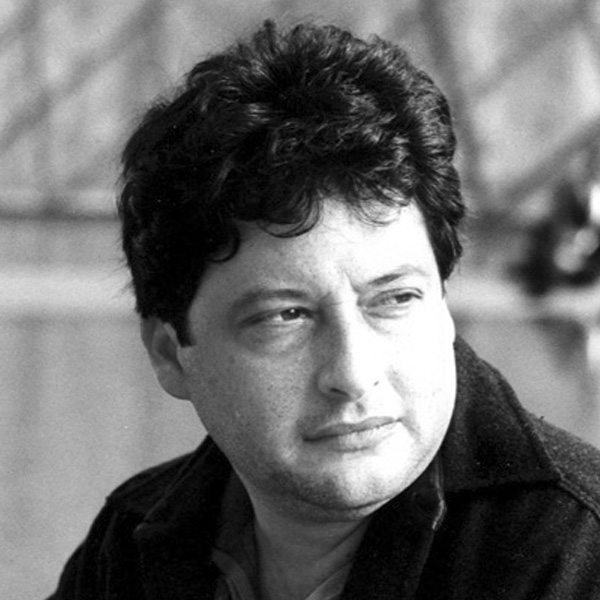
Andrés Mignucci, architect

- Jesús Eduardo Amaral (1927–2020), architect, educator; first director of the School of Architecture at the University of Puerto Rico; Fellow of the American Institute of Architects
- Félix Benítez Rexach (1886–1975), architect and engineer; designed the Normandie Hotel, located in San Juan, Puerto Rico
- Segundo Cardona FAIA (born 1950, San Juan, PR), architect, developer; Fellow of the American Institute of Architects since 2006
- Pedro Adolfo de Castro y Besosa (1895–1936), architect; first Puerto Rican to graduate from an American architecture university; work highlights include Casa de España, Castillo Serrallés
- Toro Ferrer, pioneering Puerto Rican architectural firm led by Osvaldo Toro FAIA and Miguel Ferrer FAIA, both Fellows of the American Institute of Architects and responsible for such landmarks as the Caribe Hilton, the Supreme Court, the Luis Muñoz Marin International Airport and the Hotel La Concha
- Henry Klumb (1905–1984), German-born architect responsible for many Puerto Rico designs from 1944 to 1984; Fellow of the American Institute of Architects
- Andrés Mignucci (1957–2022), architect, urbanist; Fellow of the American Institute of Architects; Henry Klumb Award 2012
- Antonio Miró Montilla (born 1937), architect, educator; first architect appointed head of a government agency, the Puerto Rico Public Buildings Authority, 1969 to 1971; first dean of the School of Architecture at the University of Puerto Rico, Río Piedras Campus, 1971 to 1978; Chancellor of the Río Piedras Campus of the University of Puerto Rico, 1978 to 1985
- Antonin Nechodoma (1877–1928), Czech architect working in Puerto Rico and the Dominican Republic at the turn of the 20th century; major works include the Georgetti Mansion, the Casa Korber in Miramar, and Casa Roig in Humacao
- Francisco Porrata-Doria (1890–1971), designed the Ponce Cathedral, Banco de Ponce, and Banco Crédito y Ahorro Ponceño
- Blas Silva (1869–1949), creator of the Ponce Creole architectural style; designed, among many others, the Casa de la Masacre, Font-Ubides House, and the Subira House
- Alfredo Wiechers Pieretti (1881–1964), early 20th-century architect from Ponce; designed many historical buildings now listed in the National Register of Historic Places, including his own home (the Wiechers-Villaronga Residence) in the Ponce Historic Zone, which today is home to the Puerto Rico Museum of Architecture

== Authors, playwrights and poets ==
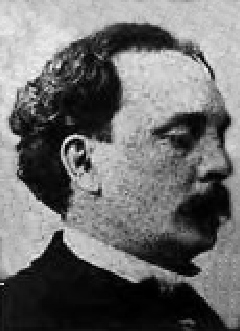
Alejandro Tapia y Rivera

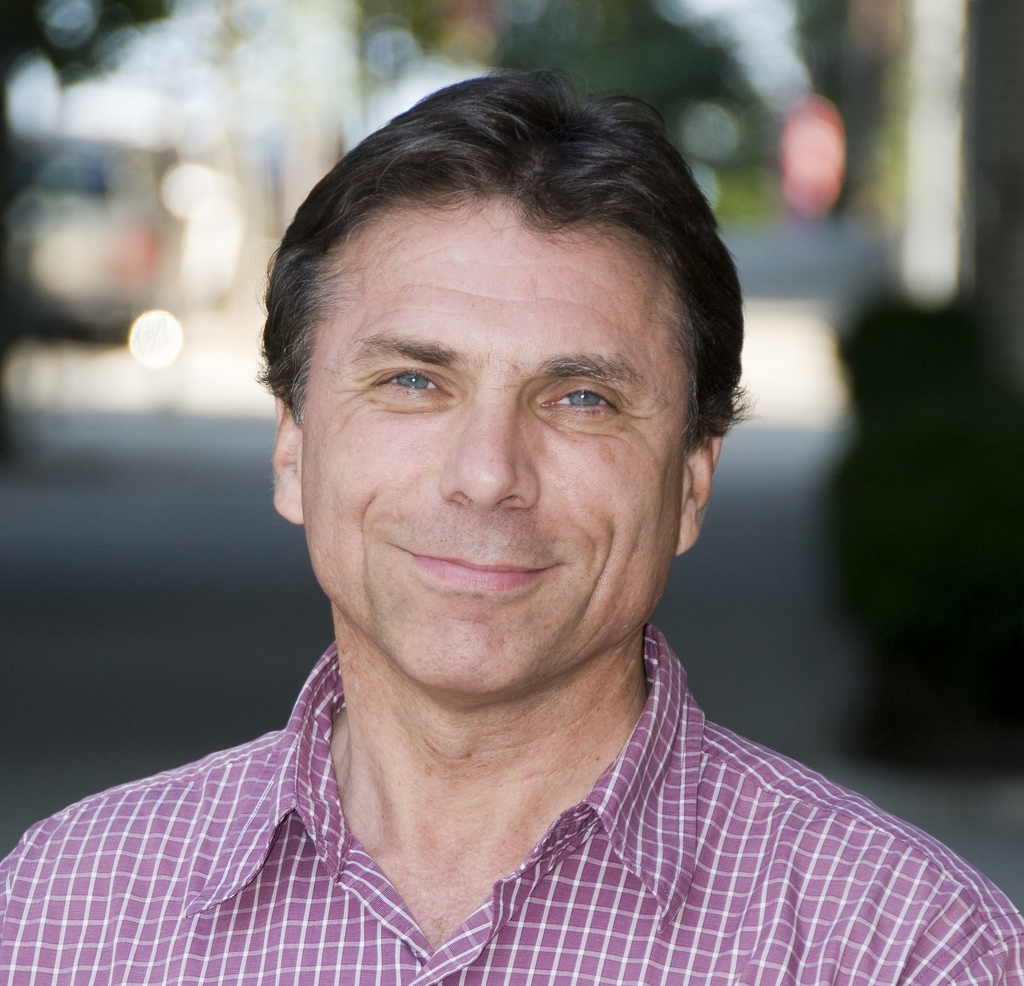
Nelson Denis

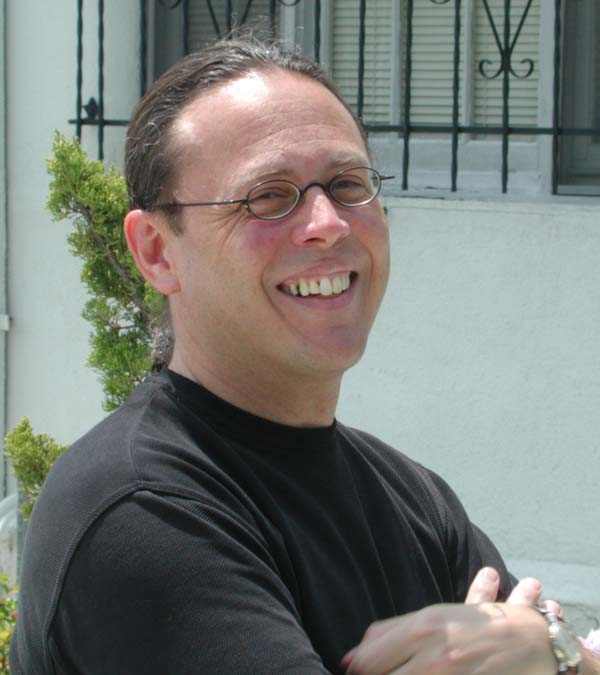
José Rivera, playwright

=== A ===
- Jack Agüeros (1934–2014), author, playwright, poet and translator
- Quiara Alegría Hudes (born 1977), author, playwright; wrote the book for the Broadway musical In the Heights; winner of 2012 Pulitzer Prize for Drama; her play, Elliot, a Soldier's Fugue, was a Pulitzer Prize finalist in 2007 and has been performed around the country and in Romania and Brazil
- Miguel Algarín (1941–2020), poet, writer, co-founder of the Nuyorican Poets Café
- Manuel A. Alonso (1822–1889), poet and author, considered by many to be the first Puerto Rican writer of notable importance
- Marta Aponte Alsina (born 1945), writer; author of La muerte feliz de William Carlos Williams
- Francisco Arriví (1915–2007), writer, poet, and playwright; known as "the father of the Puerto Rican theater"
- Rane Arroyo (1954–2010), poet, playwright and scholar

=== B ===
- Pura Belpré (1899–1982), author; first Puerto Rican librarian in New York City
- Samuel Beníquez (born 1971), author of the autobiographical book Tu alto precio ... Mi gran valor
- María Bibiana Benítez (1783–1873), playwright, poet
- Alejandrina Benítez de Gautier (1819–1879), poet whose collaboration with the "Aguinaldo Puertorriqueño" (collection of Puerto Rican poetry) gave her recognition as a great poet
- Tomás Blanco (1896–1975), writer and historian; author of Prontuario Historico de Puerto Rico and El Prejuicio Racial en Puerto Rico (Racial Prejudice in Puerto Rico)
- Juan Boria (1906–1995), Afro-Caribbean poet, also known as the Negro Verse Pharaoh; known for his Afro-Caribbean poetry
- Carmen Bozello y Guzmán (1856–1885), writer
- Giannina Braschi (born 1953), a National Endowment for the Arts Fellow; author of Yo-Yo Boing! and United States of Banana

=== C ===
- María Cadilla Colón de Martínez (1884–1951), writer, educator and women's rights activist
- Zenobia Camprubí (1887–1956), writer/poet (Puerto Rican mother); wife of Nobel Prize winning author Juan Ramón Jiménez
- Nemesio Canales (1878–1923), essayist and poet
- Jesús Colón (1901–1974), writer; "father of the Nuyorican Movement"
- Manuel Corchado y Juarbe (1840–1884), poet, journalist and politician; defended the abolition of slavery and the establishment of a university in Puerto Rico
- Juan Antonio Corretjer (1908–1985), poet, journalist and pro-independence political activist (member of the Nationalist Party) who opposed United States rule in Puerto Rico
- Conchita Cuchí Coll de Carlo (1907–1981), essayist and pacifist

=== D ===
- Nicholas Dante (1941–1991), 'Pulitzer Prize and Tony Award-winning playwright who is best known for the worldwide musical hit A Chorus Line
- José Antonio Dávila (1898–1941), well-known poet during Puerto Rico's postmodern era of poetry
- Virgilio Dávila (1869–1943), poet, considered by many to be one of Puerto Rico's greatest representatives of the modern literary era
- Julia de Burgos (1914–1953), poet
- Eugenio María de Hostos (1839–1903), wrote La Peregrinación de Bayoán, the founding text of Puerto Rican literature (see also "Educators" and "Politicians")
- Caridad de la Luz (born 1977), a.k.a. "La Bruja", poet; writer/actor of Boogie Rican Blvd
- Nelson Denis (born 1955), author, novelist; editorial director of El Diario La Prensa; New York State Assemblyman
- Jaquira Díaz, writer, journalist
- Abelardo Díaz Alfaro (1916–1999), writer
- Emilio Díaz Valcárcel (1929–2015), writer

=== E ===
- Sandra María Esteves (born 1948), Nuyorican poet

=== F ===
- Héctor Feliciano (born 1952), author; his book The Lost Museum: The Nazi Conspiracy to Steal the World's Greatest Works of Art has shed light on an estimated 20,000 looted works; each one is owned by a museum or a collector somewhere
- Rosario Ferré (1938–2016), writer
- Shaggy Flores (born 1973), Nuyorican writer, poet; African diaspora scholar; founder of Voices for the Voiceless
- Carlos Fonseca Suárez (born 1987), Costa Rican-Puerto Rican writer and academic; works include the novels Colonel Lágrimas, Museo animal, and Austral
- Félix Franco Oppenheimer (1912–2004), poet and writer; works include Contornos, Imagen y visión edénica de Puerto Rico, and Antología poética
- Isabel Freire de Matos (1915–2004), writer, educator and advocate of Puerto Rican independence

=== G ===
- Magali García Ramis (born 1946), writer
- José Gautier Benítez (1851–1880), leading Puerto Rican poet of the Romantic Era
- José Luis González (1926–1997), one of the most prominent writers of the 20th century, particularly for his El país de cuatro pisos (1980)
- Migene González Wippler (born 1936), new-age author, Santería researcher

=== H ===
- Víctor Hernández Cruz (born 1949), poet; in 1969, became the first Hispanic to be published by a mainstream publishing house when Random House published his poem "Snaps;" in 1981, Life Magazine named him one of America's greatest poets

=== L ===
- Lawrence La Fountain-Stokes (born 1968), writer; author of Uñas pintadas de azul/Blue Fingernails
- Enrique A. Laguerre (1906–2005), writer; nominated in 1998, for the Nobel Prize in literature
- Eduardo Lalo (born 1960), writer; author of Simone
- Tato Laviera (1950–2013), poet; author of AmeRícan
- Georgina Lázaro (born 1965), children's poet
- Muna Lee (1895–1965), Mississippi-born writer; first wife of Luis Muñoz Marín
- Aurora Levins Morales (born 1954), writer and poet; author of Medicine Stories (1998) and Remedios: Stories of Earth and Iron from the History of Puertorriqueñas (1998)
- Teresita A. Levy, author of The History of Tobacco Cultivation in Puerto Rico, 1898–1940, a study of the tobacco-growing regions in the eastern and western highlands of Puerto Rico from 1898 to 1940
- Luis Lloréns Torres (1876–1944), poet
- Washington Lloréns (1899–1989), journalist, writer, linguist, and scholar
- Luis López Nieves (born 1950), writer

=== M ===
- Hugo Margenat (1933–1957), poet; founder of the political youth pro-independence organizations Acción Juventud Independentista and Federación de Universitarios Pro Independencia
- René Marqués (1919–1979), playwright; wrote La Carreta (The Oxcart), which helped secure his reputation as a leading literary figure in Puerto Rico
- Nemir Matos Cintrón (born 1949), poet, novelist
- Francisco Matos Paoli (1915–2000), poet, critic, and essayist; nominated for the Nobel Prize in literature in 1977; a Secretary General of the Puerto Rican Nationalist Party
- Concha Meléndez (1895–1983), poet, writer
- Manuel Méndez Ballester (1909–2002), writer
- Nancy Mercado (born 1959), poet, playwright; author of It Concerns the Madness, seven theatre plays, and a number of essays; her work has been extensively anthologized
- Pedro Mir (1913–2000), Poet Laureate of the Dominican Republic (Puerto Rican mother)
- Nicholasa Mohr (born 1938), writer; her works, among which is the novel Nilda, tell of growing up in the Bronx and El Barrio and of the difficulties Puerto Rican women face in the United States; in 1973, became the first Hispanic woman in modern times to have her literary works published by the major commercial publishing houses; has had the longest career as a creative writer for these publishing houses of any Hispanic female writer
- Rosario Morales (1930–2011), author; co-author of Getting Home Alive (1986) with her daughter Aurora Levins Morales

=== N ===
- Richie Narvaez (born 1965), short story writer and novelist, author of Hipster Death Rattle (2019) and Noiryorican (2020)
- Mercedes Negrón Muñoz (1895–1973), a.k.a. "Clara Lair"; poet whose work dealt with the everyday struggles of the common Puerto Rican

=== O ===
- Judith Ortiz Cofer (1952–2016), poet, writer and essayist; in 1994, became the first Hispanic to win the O. Henry Prize for her story "The Latin Deli"; in 1996, she and illustrator Susan Guevara became the first recipients of the Pura Belpre Award for Hispanic children's literature
- Micol Ostow (born 1976), author of Mind Your Manners, Dick and Jane and Emily Goldberg Learns to Salsa

=== P ===
- José Gualberto Padilla (1829–1896), a.k.a. "El Caribe", poet, physician, journalist and politician; advocate for Puerto Rico's independence; was imprisoned for his role in the El Grito de Lares revolt
- Luis Palés Matos (1898–1959), poet of Afro-Caribbean themes
- Benito Pastoriza Iyodo (1954–2022), writer, poet
- Antonio S. Pedreira (1899–1939), writer and educator whose most important book was Insularismo, in which he explores the meaning of being Puerto Rican
- Pedro Pietri (1944–2004), poet, playwright; co-founder of the Nuyorican Poets Café
- Miguel Piñero (1946–1988), playwright, writer; co-founder of the Nuyorican Poets Café

=== R ===
- Manuel Ramos Otero (1948–1990), writer, poet
- Evaristo Ribera Chevremont (1896–1976), poet
- José Rivera (born 1955), playwright; first Puerto Rican screenwriter to be nominated for an Oscar
- Marie Teresa Ríos (1917–1999), author of the novel The Fifteenth Pelican, which was the basis for the popular 1960s television sitcom The Flying Nun
- Lola Rodríguez de Tió (1843–1924), poet; wrote the lyrics to the revolutionary "La Borinqueña"
- Francisco Rojas Tollinchi (1911–1965), poet, civic leader and journalist

=== S ===
- Luis Rafael Sánchez (born 1936), novelist, playwright
- Wilfredo Santa Gómez (born 1949), writer, journalist
- Esmeralda Santiago (born 1948), author
- Mayra Santos Febres (born 1966), poet, novelist
- Pedro Juan Soto (1928–2002), writer/novelist; father of slain independence activist Carlos Soto Arriví
- Clemente Soto Vélez (1905–1993), poet and pro-independence activist (member of the Nationalist Party)

=== T ===
- Alejandro Tapia y Rivera (1826–1882), writer and poet; "the father of Puerto Rican literature"
- Piri Thomas (1928–2011), writer, poet whose autobiography Down These Mean Streets was a best-seller
- Luisita Lopez Torregrosa (born 1943), journalist and memoirist
- Edwin Torres (born 1958), Nuyorican Movement poet
- Judge Edwin Torres (born 1931), writer; New York Supreme Court Justice; wrote Carlito's Way
- J. L. Torres (born 1954), writer and poet; wrote The Accidental Native
- Justin Torres (born 1980), writer; wrote We the Animals, also adapted to a film

=== U ===
- Luz María Umpierre (born 1947), poet, scholar

=== V ===
- Lourdes Vázquez (born 1953), writer and poet
- Edgardo Vega Yunqué (1936–2008), novelist, also known as Ed Vega
- Mayda Del Valle (born 1978), American slam poet
- Irene Vilar (born 1969), author and literary agent; granddaughter of independence activist Lolita Lebrón

=== W ===
- William Carlos Williams (1883–1963), Modernist poet (Puerto Rican mother)

=== X ===
- Emanuel Xavier (born 1971), poet and author (Puerto Rican father)

=== Z ===
- Manuel Zeno Gandía (1855–1930), writer; wrote La Charca, the first Puerto Rican novel

== Beauty queens and fashion models ==
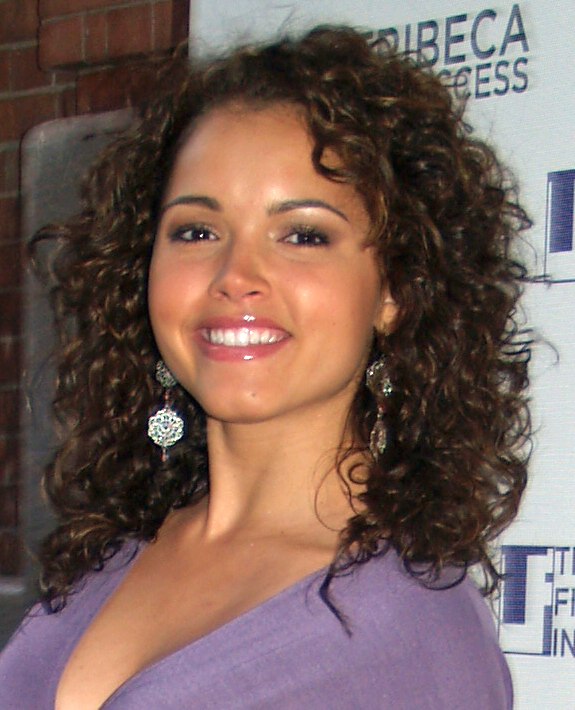
Susie Castillo, Miss USA

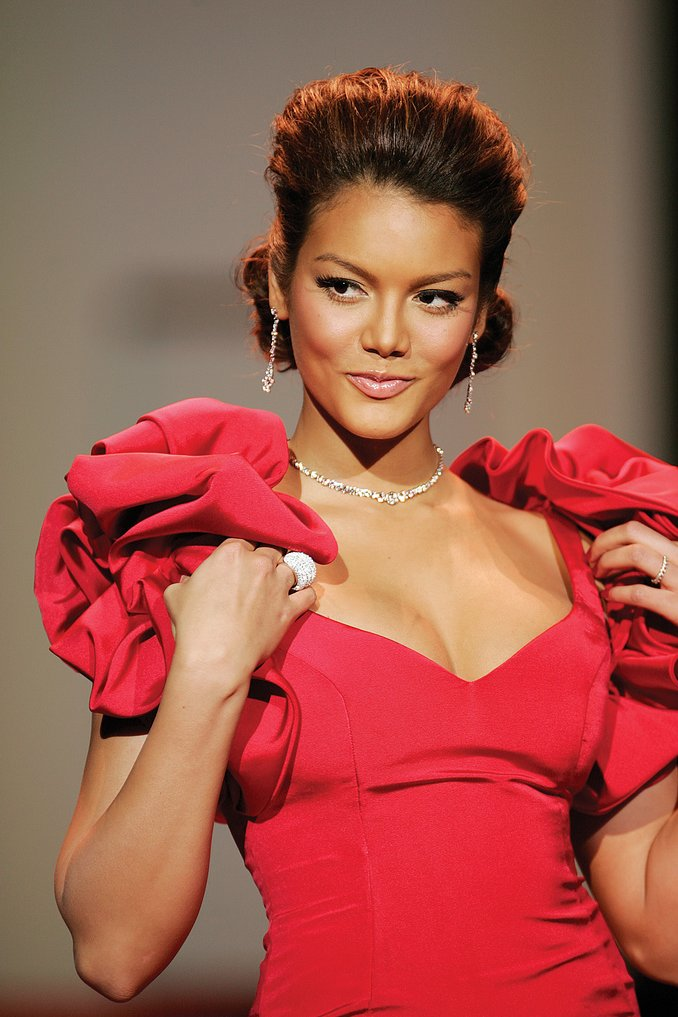
Zuleyka Rivera, Miss Universe

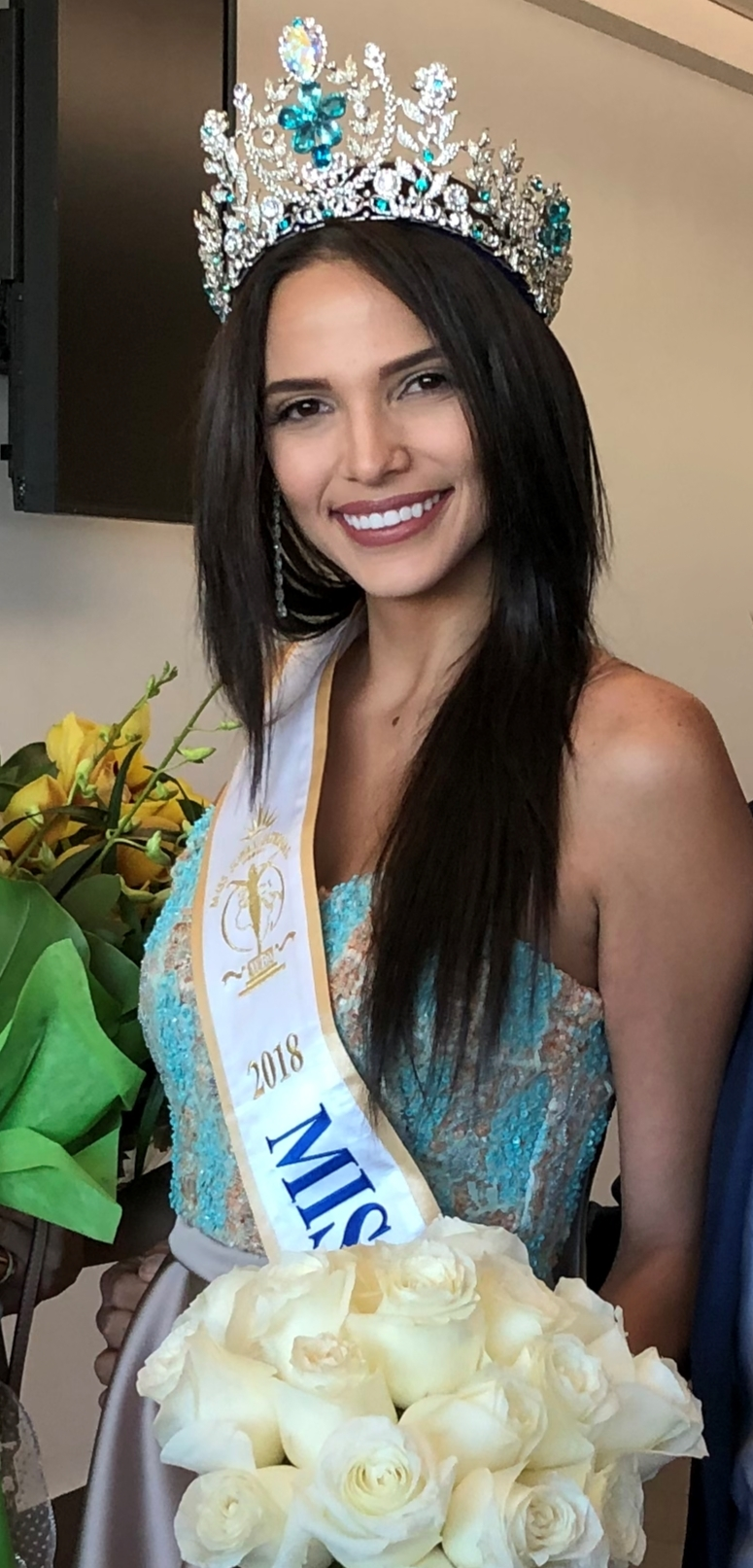
Valeria Vazquez Latorre, Miss Supranational 2018

- Ada Perkins (1959–1980), Miss Puerto Rico 1978
- Aleyda Ortiz (born 1988), Nuestra Belleza Latina 2014
- Astrid Muñoz (born 1974), fashion model
- Chay Santini (born 1976), fashion model
- Cynthia Olavarría (born 1986), Miss Puerto Rico 2005. First Puerto Rican woman to win the spot of the first runner-up of Miss Universe 2005
- Dayanara Torres (born 1974), Miss Universe 1993
- Deborah Carthy Deu (born 1966), Miss Universe 1985
- Denise Quiñones (born 1980), Miss Universe 2001
- Ingrid Marie Rivera (born 1983), Miss Puerto Rico World 2005
- Irma Nydia Vázquez (1929–2019), first Miss Puerto Rico in the Miss America pageant, breaking the color barrier, 1948
- Jaslene González (born 1986), fashion model, winner of America's Next Top Model, Cycle 8
- Joan Smalls (born 1985), fashion model and host of MTV's series House of Style
- Laurie Tamara Simpson (born 1968), Miss International 1987
- Madison Anderson Berrios (born 1995), won the Miss Universe Puerto Rico title in 2019. On December 8, 2019, she won the spot of the first runner-up of Miss Universe 2019.
- Marisol Malaret (1949–2023), first Puerto Rican Miss Universe, 1970
- Marisol Maldonado (born 1970), fashion model
- Melissa Marty (born 1984), Nuestra Belleza Latina 2008
- Miriam Pabón (born 1985), beauty queen, first contestant in half a century to represent Puerto Rico in the Miss America pageant
- [(Nellys Pimentel0} (born 1997), first Puerto Rican Miss Earth, 2019
- Sofía Jirau (born 1997), first fashion model with Down syndrome to be hired by Victoria's Secret
- Stella Díaz (born 1984), fashion model
- Stephanie Del Valle (born 1996), second Puerto Rican Miss World, 2016
- Susie Castillo (born 1979), Miss USA 2003 (Puerto Rican mother)
- Noris Díaz ("La Taína") (born 1975), model
- Valerie Hernández (born 1993), Miss International 2014
- Valeria Vazquez Latorre (born 1994), first Puerto Rican to win the Miss Supranational pageant (2018)
- Vanessa De Roide (born 1987), Nuestra Belleza Latina 2012
- Wilnelia Merced (born 1957), first Puerto Rican Miss World, 1975
- Zuleyka Rivera (born 1987), Miss Universe 2006

== Business people and industrialists ==
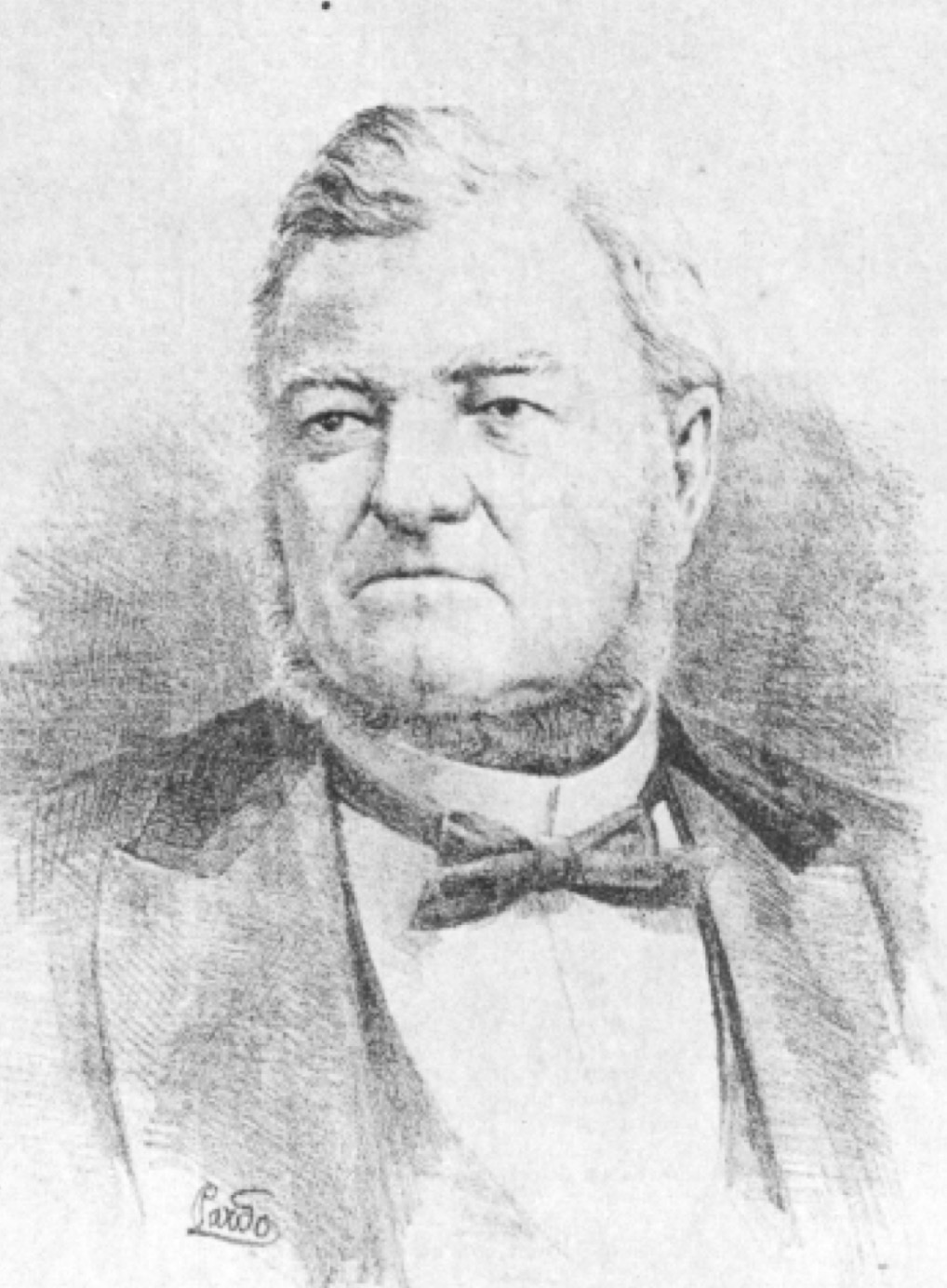
José Ramon Fernández, "Marqués de La Esperanza"

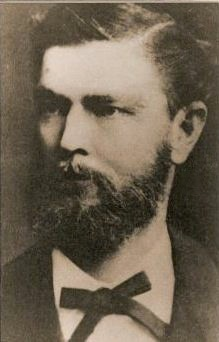
Juan Serrallés, industrialist, founder of Destilería Serralles, makers of Don Q rum

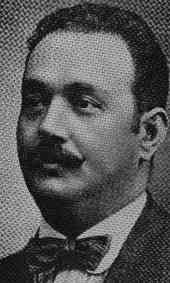
Eduardo Georgetti, wealthy sugar baron

- Carlota Alfaro (born 1933), fashion designer
- Aída Álvarez (born 1950), first Puerto Rican and first Hispanic woman to hold a sub-cabinet-level position in the White House (Small Business Administrator 1997–2000)
- José Berrocal (1957–2000), youngest president of PR Government Development Bank; annual scholarships are awarded in his memory
- Orlando Bravo (born 1970), co-founder and managing partner of private equity investment firm Thoma Bravo; called "the first Puerto Rican-born billionaire" by Forbes
- Rafael Carrión Sr. (1891–1964), patriarch of one Puerto Rico's financial dynasties; a founding father of Banco Popular de Puerto Rico, the largest bank in Puerto Rico and the largest Hispanic bank in the United States
- Arturo L. Carrión Muñoz (born 1933), former executive vice president of the Puerto Rico Bankers Association
- Richard Carrión (born 1952), Chairman of the Board Banco Popular; chairman International Olympic Committee's finance committee
- Kimberly Casiano (born 1957), member of the board of directors of the Ford Motor Company
- Ramiro L. Colón (1904–1983), first administrator of Cooperativa de Cafeteros de Puerto Rico, Café Rico (official coffee of the Vatican)
- Francisco J. Collazo (born 1931), founder of COLSA Corporation, a first-rate provider of engineering and support services in Huntsville, Alabama
- Deirdre Connelly (born 1961), president of North America Pharmaceuticals for GlaxoSmithKline, member of the global corporate executive team; co-chairs the portfolio management board, along with the chairman of research and development
- Atilano Cordero Badillo (born 1943), founder of Supermercados Grande
- Carmen Ana Culpeper (born 1945), former SBA Regional Director; first female PR Treasury Secretary and PR Telephone Company President
- Óscar de la Renta (1932–2014), fashion designer (Puerto Rican father from Cabo Rojo, Puerto Rico)
- Fernando Fernández (1850–1940), founder of Ron del Barrilito and Alcoholado Santa Ana
- José Ramón Fernández (1808–1883), "Marqués de La Esperanza", the wealthiest sugar baron in Puerto Rico in the 19th century; considered one of the most powerful men of the entire Spanish Caribbean
- Antonio Luis Ferré (1934–2024), owner of the Ferré-Rangel media emporium
- Jaime Fonalledas (born 1946), President and CEO of Empresas Fonalledas, which owns Plaza Las Américas, the largest shopping mall in the Caribbean and one of the top retail and entertainment venues in the world; Fonalledas' companies include Plaza Del Caribe, Tres Monjitas, Vaqueria Tres Monjitas, Ganaderia Tres Monjitas, and franchise Soft & Creamy
- José Juan García (1940–2002), founder of Hogares Crea
- Eduardo Georgetti (1866–1937), agriculturist, businessman, philanthropist, politician and sugar baron
- Victoria Hernández (1897–1998), music entrepreneur and businesswoman; in 1927, she opened the first Latin music store in New York City, one of only sixteen businesses owned by Puerto Rican migrant women; sister of Rafael Hernández Marín
- María Elena Holly (born 1932), widow of rock legend Buddy Holly; owns the rights to Buddy's name, image, trademarks, and other intellectual property
- Teófilo José Jaime María Le Guillou (1790–1843), a.k.a. the "Father of Vieques"; founder of the municipality of Vieques; one of the wealthiest sugar barons in Puerto Rico
- Ramón López Irizarry (1897–1982), inventor of Coco López
- Héctor Maisonave (1930–2022), organized 7,000 salsa concerts; owned the Casa Blanca dance club; managed Héctor Lavoe and other salsa artists
- Miguel A. García Méndez (1902–1998), founder of Western Federal Savings Bank, which later became the Westernbank Puerto Rico (now defunct)
- Gildo Massó (1926–2007), founder of Massó Enterprises and Casa's Massó
- Ralph Mercado (1941–2009), founder of RMM Records and music producer
- Luis Miranda Casañas (1937–2019), CEO of the multi-state Universal insurance emporium
- Lisette Nieves (born 1970), founder of ATREVETE
- Rafael Antonio Nazario (born 1952), pianist, composer and arranger and actor; co-founder of restaurant chain Guzman y Gomez
- Luis D. Ortiz (born 1986), real estate broker and reality television personality (series Million Dollar Listing New York)
- Wilbert Parkhurst, in 1921, founded Empresas La Famosa, Inc., a fruit processing company that by 1971 consisted of Frozen Fruits Concentrates, Inc., Toa Canning Co., La Concentradora de Puerto Rico and Bayamón Can Company
- Terren Peizer (born 1959), businessperson, convicted of insider trading and securities fraud
- Rafael Pérez Perry (1911–1978), in 1960 founded television channel 11, also known as Telecadena Pérez Perry, became known as Tele Once in 1986
- Samuel A. Ramírez Sr. (born 1941), President and founder of Ramirez and Co., an investment banking firm on Wall Street
- Ángel Ramos (1902–1960), founder of the Telemundo television network
- Gaspar Roca (1926–2007), founder of newspaper El Vocero
- Amaury Rivera (born 1962), chairman and CEO of Kinetics Systems Caribe
- Miguel Ruíz (1856–1912), founder of Café Yaucono
- Herb Scannell (born 1957), former chairman of MTV Networks and president of Nickelodeon
- Juan Serrallés (1845–1921), founder of Don Q rum
- Nina Tassler, President of CBS Entertainment; the highest profile Latina in network television and one of the few executives who has the power to greenlight series
- Joseph A. Unanue (1925–2013), president and CEO of Goya Foods; son of the company's founder
- Alfonso Valdés Cobián (1890–1988), co-founder of Cervecería India, Inc. and the Puerto Rican winter baseball league; owner of the Indios de Mayagüez (Mayagüez Indians)
- Camalia Valdés (born 1972), president and CEO of Cerveceria India, Inc., Puerto Rico's largest brewery
- Salvador Vassallo (1942–2007), founder of Vassallo Industries Inc. and subsidiaries
- Richard Velázquez (born 1973), businessman and community leader; former president of NSHMBA Puerto Rico; co-founder and former president of NSHMBA Seattle; first Puerto Rican automotive designer for Porsche, first Puerto Rican product planner for Xbox 360
- María Vizcarrondo-De Soto (born 1951), first woman and Latina to become the president and CEO of the United Way of Essex and West Hudson

== Cartoonists ==
John Rivas

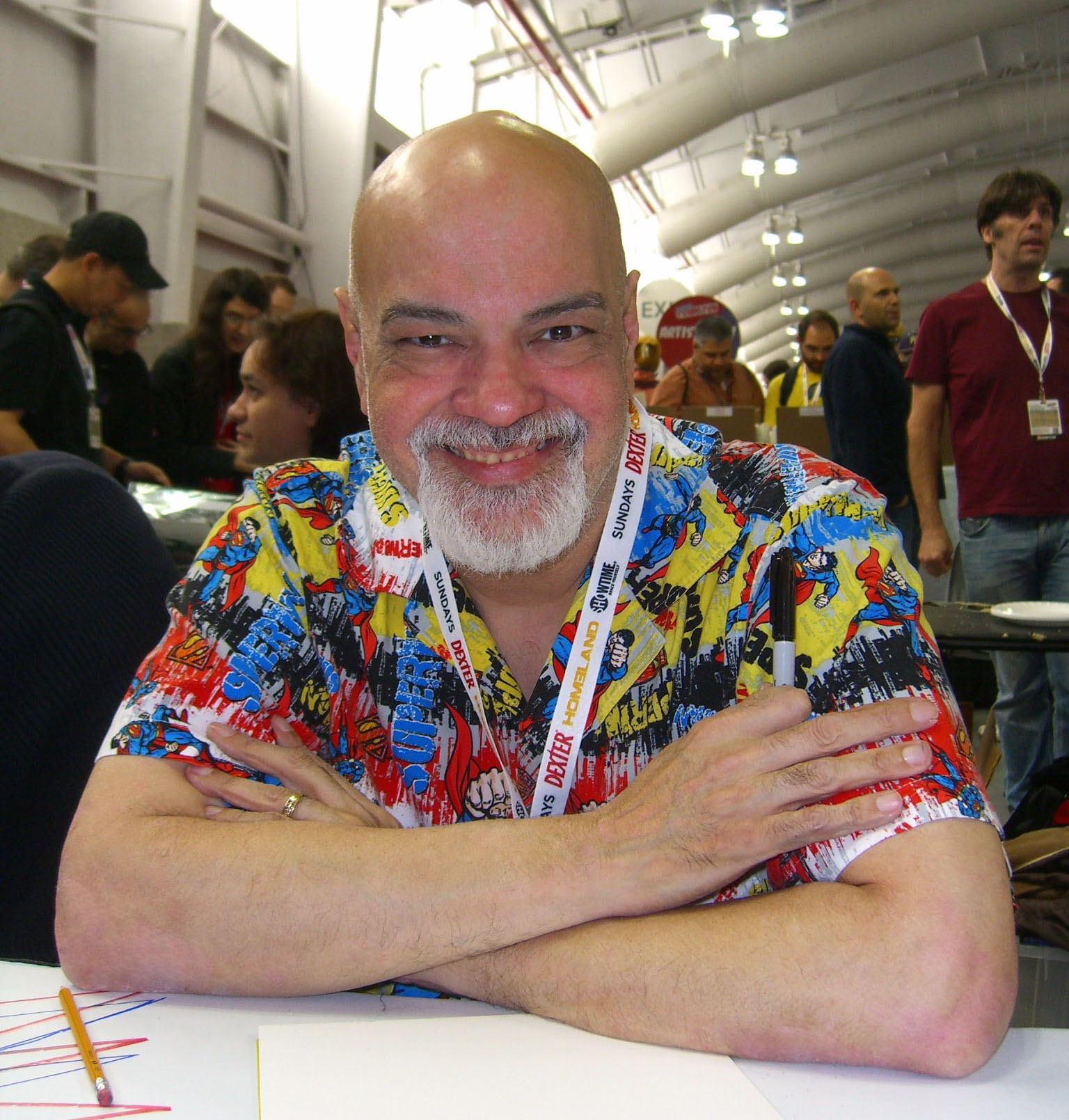
George Pérez

- David Álvarez (born 1976), creator of the comic strip Yenny, illustrator and storyboard artist for DC Comics' Looney Tunes series
- Ricardo Álvarez-Rivón, creator of the comic Turey
- Carmelo Filardi (1900–1989)
- Rags Morales, comic book artist; co-creator, along with Brian Augustyn, of the 1990s version of Black Condor
- George Pérez (1954–2022), Marvel and DC Comics iconic comic book artist and writer
- John Rivas, creator of the comic strip Bonzzo
- Kenneth Rocafort (born 1983), Marvel and DC Comics comic book artist
- José Vega Santana (born 1958), creator of the Remi comic and impersonator of "Remi, The Clown"

== Civil rights and political activists ==
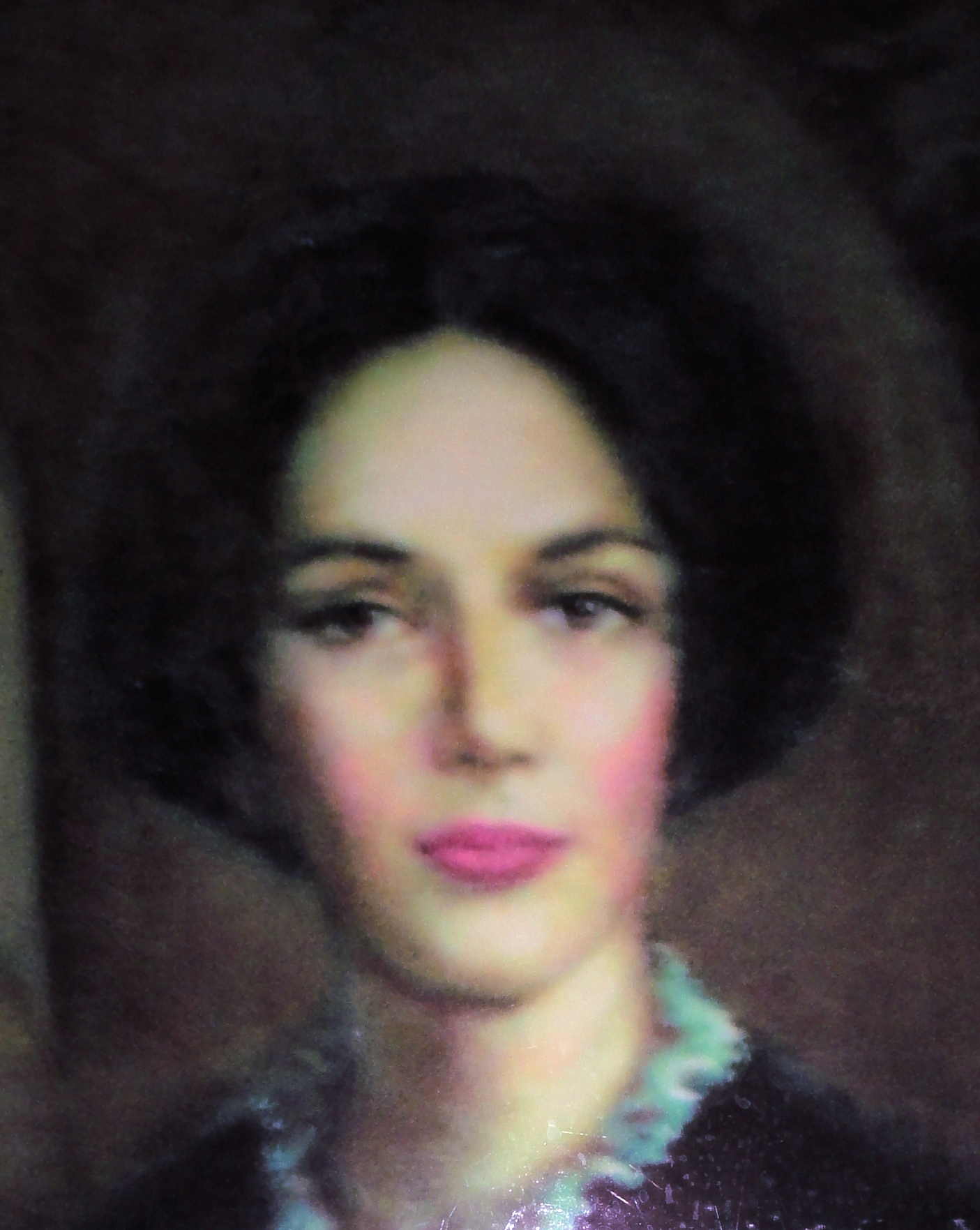
María de las Mercedes Barbudo

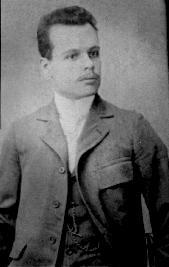
José Maldonado Román

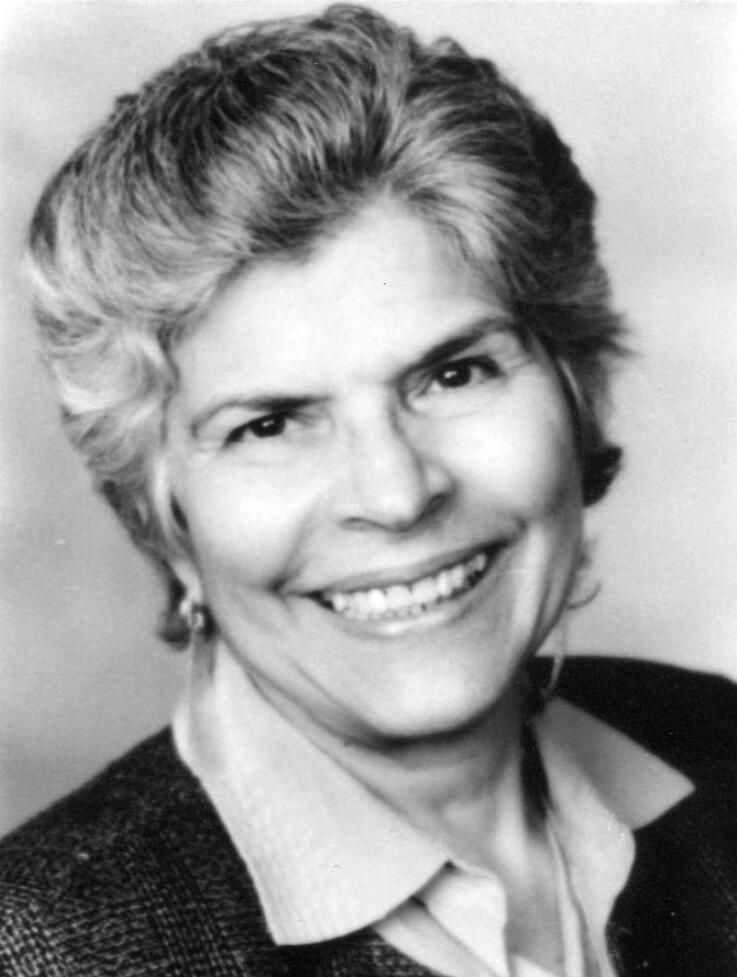
Helen Rodríguez Trías, women's rights activist and recipient of the Presidential Citizen's Medal

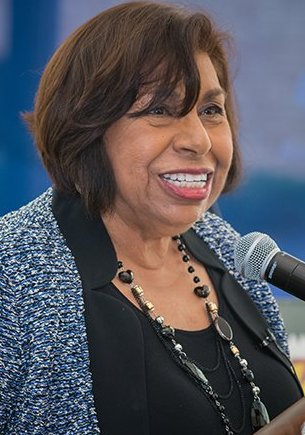
Sylvia Mendez

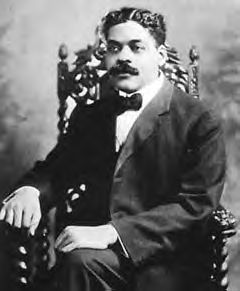
Arturo Alfonso Schomburg

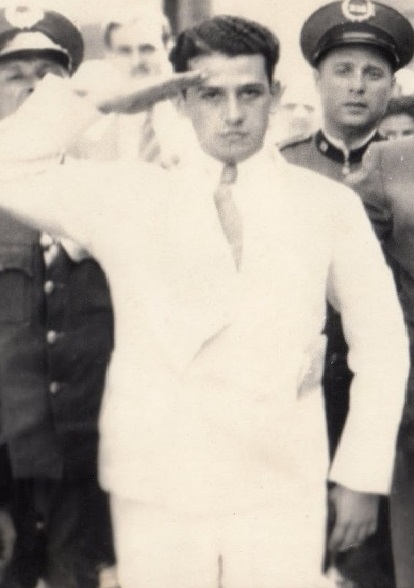
Elías Beauchamp

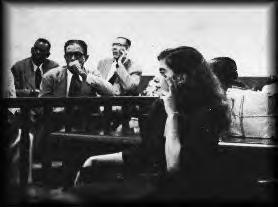
Olga Viscal Garriga

- María de las Mercedes Barbudo (1773–1849), political activist; often called the first female Puerto Rican "Independentista"
- Rosario Bellber González (1881–1948), educator, social worker, women's rights activist, suffragist, and philanthropist; initiator, vice president and one of the founders of the Puerto Rico Teachers Association (Spanish: Asociación de Maestros de Puerto Rico); Bellber is also one of the founders of the Children's Hospital of Puerto Rico (Spanish: Hospital del Niño de Puerto Rico) and president of the Social League of Suffragists of Puerto Rico (Spanish: La Liga Social Sufragista (LSS) de Puerto Rico); in 1944, founded the House of Health and Convalescence for Children with Tuberculosis (Spanish: Sanatorio para Niños con Tuberculosis) in the mountain town of Aibonito
- Mariana Bracetti (1825–1903) a.k.a. "Brazo de Oro" ("Golden Arm"), political activist; leader of the Lares's Revolutionary Council during the Grito de Lares; knit the first flag of the future Republic of Puerto Rico
- Mathias Brugman (1811–1868), political activist; leader of the Grito de Lares; founded the first revolutionary committee in the City of Mayagüez; his revolutionary cell was code named "Capa Prieta" (Black Cape)
- María Cadilla (1884–1951), women's rights activist; one of the first women in Puerto Rico to earn a doctoral degree
- Luisa Capetillo (1879–1922), labor activist; one of Puerto Rico's most famous labor organizers; writer and an anarchist who fought for workers and women's rights
- Alice Cardona (1930–2011), activist and community organizer
- Dennis Flores, activist and filmmaker
- Tito Kayak (born 1958), political activist; gained notoriety when a group of Vieques natives and other Puerto Ricans began protesting and squatting on U.S. Navy bombing zones after the 1999 death of Puerto Rican civilian and Vieques native David Sanes, who was killed during a U.S. Navy bombing exercise
- Sylvia del Villard (1928–1990), Afro-Puerto Rican activist, founder of the Afro-Boricua El Coquí Theater; an outspoken activist who fought for the equal rights of the Black Puerto Rican artist; in 1981, she became the first and only director of the Office of Afro-Puerto Rican Affairs of the Instituto de Cultura Puertorriqueña (Puerto Rican Institute of Culture) (see also "Actresses")
- Isabel González (1882–1971), civil rights activist; young Puerto Rican mother who paved the way for Puerto Ricans to be given United States citizenship
- Lillian López (1925–2005), librarian and labor activist; founder of the New York Public Library South Bronx Project; advocate for library and education services for Spanish-speaking communities
- Óscar López Rivera (born 1943), pro-independence activist; the longest incarcerated FALN member
- José Maldonado Román (1874–1932), a.k.a. "Aguila Blanca" (White Eagle), revolutionary
- Rosa Martínez (1952–2022) and Eliana Martínez (1981–1989), AIDS activist; was involved in a notable Florida court case regarding the rights of HIV+ children in public schools
- Felícitas Méndez (1916–1998) (née Gómez), activist; with her husband, in 1946, led a community battle which set an important legal precedent for ending de jure segregation in the United States (see Mendez v. Westminster); credited with paving the way for integration and the American civil rights movement
- Ana María O'Neill (1894–1981), women's rights activist and educator; in 1929, became the first female professor in the field of commerce in the University of Puerto Rico, which she taught until 1951; urged women to participate in every aspect of civic life and to defend their right to vote
- Manuel Olivieri Sánchez (1888–1961), civil rights activist; court interpreter and a civil rights activist who led the legal battle which granted U.S. citizenship to Puerto Ricans living in Hawaii
- Olivia Paoli (1855–1942), suffragist and activist who fought for the rights of women in Puerto Rico; founder of the first theosophist lodge in Puerto Rico
- César A. Perales (born 1940), civil rights lawyer; founder of the Puerto Rican Legal Defense and Education Fund (now LatinoJustice PRLDEF); won precedent-setting lawsuits combating discrimination; New York Secretary of State
- Filiberto Ojeda Ríos (1933–2005), commander in chief ("Responsible General") of the Boricua Popular Army
- Sylvia Rae Rivera (1951–2002), transgender activist; veteran of the 1969 Stonewall riots
- Anthony Romero (born 1965), civil rights leader; executive director of the American Civil Liberties Union
- Helen Rodríguez Trías (1929–2001), physician and women's rights activist; first Latina president of the American Public Health Association; a founding member of the Women's Caucus of the American Public Health Association; recipient of the Presidential Citizen's Medal; credited with helping to expand the range of public health services for women and children in minority and low-income populations in the US, Central and South America, Africa, Asia, and the Middle East (see also "Educators" and "Scientists")
- Manuel Rojas (1831–1903), Venezuelan born Puerto Rican independence leader in the El Grito de Lares revolt against Spanish colonial rule
- Ana Roque (1853–1933), women's rights activist, educator and suffragist; one of the founders of the University of Puerto Rico
- Soraya Santiago Solla (1947–2020), transgender activist; first person in Puerto Rico to change the gender designation on their birth certificate following gender reassignment surgery
- Arturo Alfonso Schomburg (1874–1938), civil rights and pro-independence activist; pioneer in black history who helped raise awareness of the contributions by Afro-Latin Americans and Afro-Americans to society
- Pedro Julio Serrano (born 1974), human rights activist; President of Puerto Rico Para Tod@s, which strives for inclusion of LGBT community and for social justice for all in Puerto Rico; Communication Manager at the National Gay and Lesbian Task Force
- Marcos Xiorro, house slave; in 1821, planned and conspired to lead a slave revolt against the sugar plantation owners and the Spanish Colonial government in Puerto Rico

=== Nationalists ===
Political activists who were members of the Puerto Rican Nationalist Party:

- Elías Beauchamp (1908–1936), political activist and nationalist; in 1936, assassinated Elisha Francis Riggs, the United States-appointed police chief of Puerto Rico; considered a hero by the members of the Puerto Rican Independence Movement
- Blanca Canales (1906–1996), political activist; nationalist leader who led the Jayuya Uprising in 1950 against US colonial rule of Puerto Rico
- Rafael Cancel Miranda (1930–2020), political activist; member of the Puerto Rican Nationalist Party and advocate of Puerto Rican independence who attacked the United States House of Representatives in 1954
- Óscar Collazo (1914–1994), political activist; one of two nationalists who attempted to assassinate President Harry S. Truman
- Rosa Collazo (1904–1988) a.k.a. Rosa Cortéz Collazo, political activist and treasurer of the New York City branch of the Puerto Rican Nationalist Party
- Raimundo Díaz Pacheco (1906–1950), political activist; Commander-in-Chief of the Cadets of the Republic (Cadetes de la República), a quasi-military organization and official youth organization within the Puerto Rican Nationalist Party
- Andrés Figueroa Cordero (1924–1979), political activist; member of the Puerto Rican Nationalist Party; one of four nationalists who attacked the United States House of Representatives in 1954
- Irvin Flores Ramírez (1925–1994), political activist; Nationalist leader and activist; one of four nationalists who attacked the United States House of Representatives in 1954
- Lolita Lebrón (1919–2009), political activist; Nationalist leader and activist; the leader of four nationalists who attacked the United States House of Representatives in 1954
- Tomás López de Victoria (1911–?), political activist and Sub-Commander of the Cadets of the Republic; the captain in charge of the cadets who participated in the peaceful march which ended up as the Ponce massacre, he led the Nationalists in the Arecibo revolt in the Puerto Rican Nationalist Party Revolt of 1950
- Isolina Rondón (1913–1990), political activist and Treasurer of the Puerto Rican Nationalist Party; one of the few witnesses of the October 24, 1935 killing of four Nationalists by local police officers in Puerto Rico during a confrontation with the supporters of the Nationalist Party, known as the Río Piedras massacre
- Hiram Rosado (1911–1936), political activist and nationalist; in 1936 participated in the assassination of Elisha Francis Riggs, the United States-appointed police chief of Puerto Rico; he and his comrade Elías Beauchamp are considered heroes by the members of the Puerto Rican Independence Movement
- Isabel Rosado (1907–2015), political activist; imprisoned multiple times
- Vidal Santiago Díaz (1910–1982), political activist; barber of Pedro Albizu Campos and uncle of the novelist Esmeralda Santiago; made Puerto Rican media history when numerous police officers and National Guardsmen attacked him at his barbershop during the 1950 Nationalist Revolt; this was the first time in Puerto Rican history that such an attack was transmitted via radio to the public
- Griselio Torresola (1925–1950), political activist; Nationalist who died in an attempt to assassinate President Harry S. Truman in 1950
- Carlos Vélez Rieckehoff (1907–2005), political activist, former president of the New York chapter of the Puerto Rican Nationalist Party in the 1930s; in the 1990s was among the pro-independence activists who protested against the United States Navy's use of his birthplace, Vieques, as a bombing range
- Olga Viscal Garriga (1929–1995), political activist, member of the Puerto Rican Nationalist Party; in the late 1940s became a student leader at the University of Puerto Rico and spokesperson of the Puerto Rican Nationalist Party's branch in Río Piedras

== Clergy, religion ==
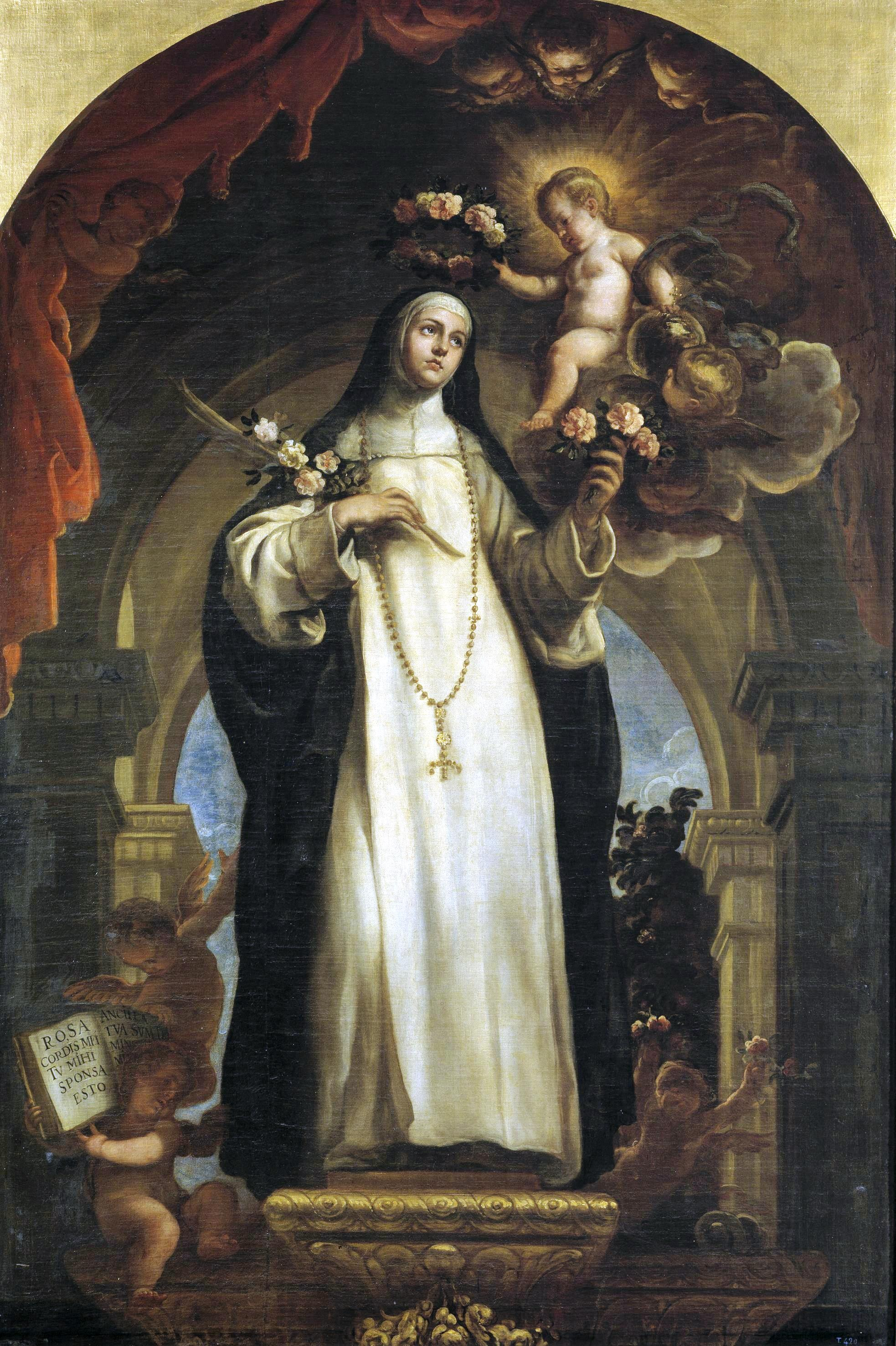
Painting of Santa Rosa de Lima

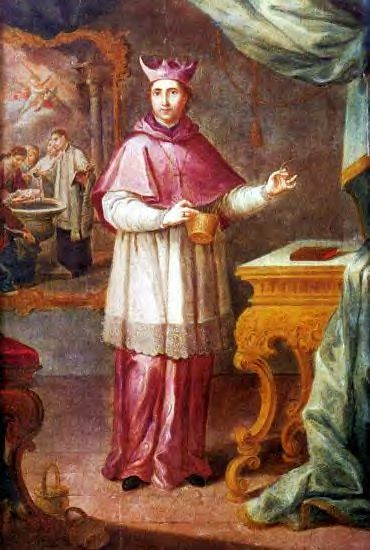
Painting of Alejo de Arizmendi

Pre–20th century

- Juan Alejo de Arizmendi (1760–1814), first Puerto Rican Roman Catholic bishop
- Francisco Ayerra de Santa María (1630–1708), priest and poet
- St. Rose of Lima (Santa Rosa de Lima) (1586–1617), Puerto Rican father
- Diego de Torres Vargas (1615–1670), first priest to write about the history of Puerto Rico

20th century

- David Andrés Álvarez Velázquez (born 1941), second native Puerto Rican to serve as bishop of the Diocese of Puerto Rico of the Episcopal Church
- Luis Aponte Martínez (1922–2012), Cardinal Archbishop Emeritus of San Juan; the only Puerto Rican cleric to date to be named cardinal
- Yiye Ávila (1925–2013), Pentecostal leader
- Nicky Cruz (born 1938), former gangster turned minister
- Sor Isolina Ferré Aguayo (1914–2000), Roman Catholic nun awarded the Presidential Medal of Freedom; sister of former governor Luis Ferré Aguayo
- Juanita García Peraza (1897–1970), founder of the Mita Congregation
- Roberto González Nieves (born 1950), Archbishop of San Juan
- Jorge Raschke (born 1945), outspoken Pentecostal pastor
- Francisco Reus Froylán (1919–2008), first native Puerto Rican bishop of the Episcopal Church
- Carlos Manuel Rodríguez Santiago (1918–1963), beatified by Pope John Paul II in 2001; first Puerto Rican and first Caribbean-born layperson to be beatified

21st century

- José Luis de Jesús Miranda (1946–2013), controversial religious leader
- Bavi Edna Rivera (born 1946), 12th woman and first Hispanic woman to become a bishop of the Episcopal Church

== Composers, singers, musicians and opera performers ==
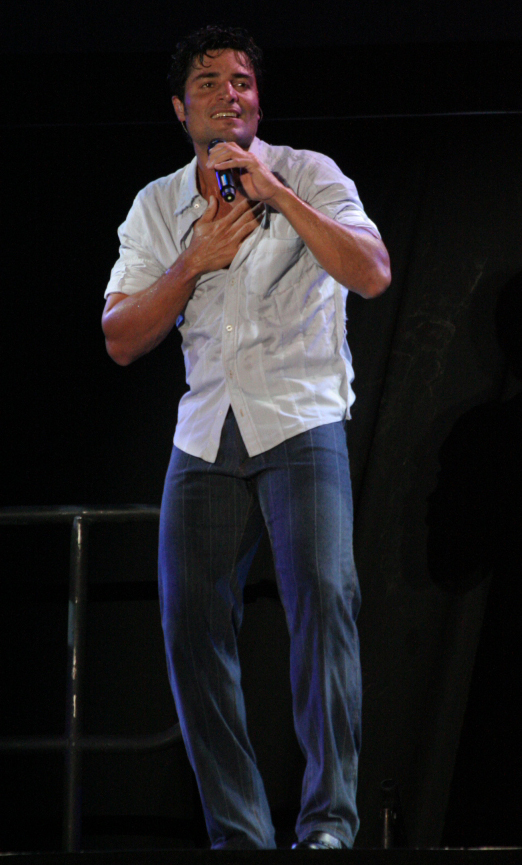
Chayanne

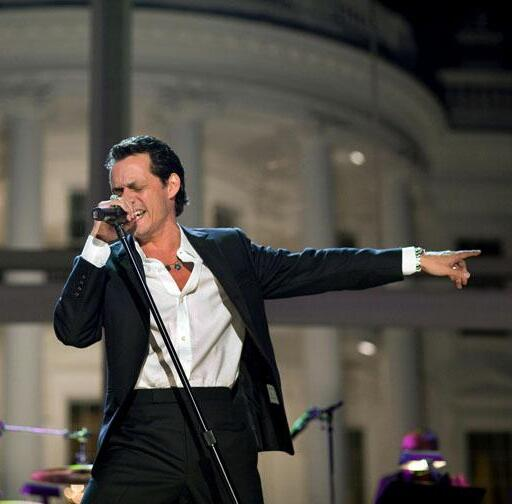
Marc Anthony, singer

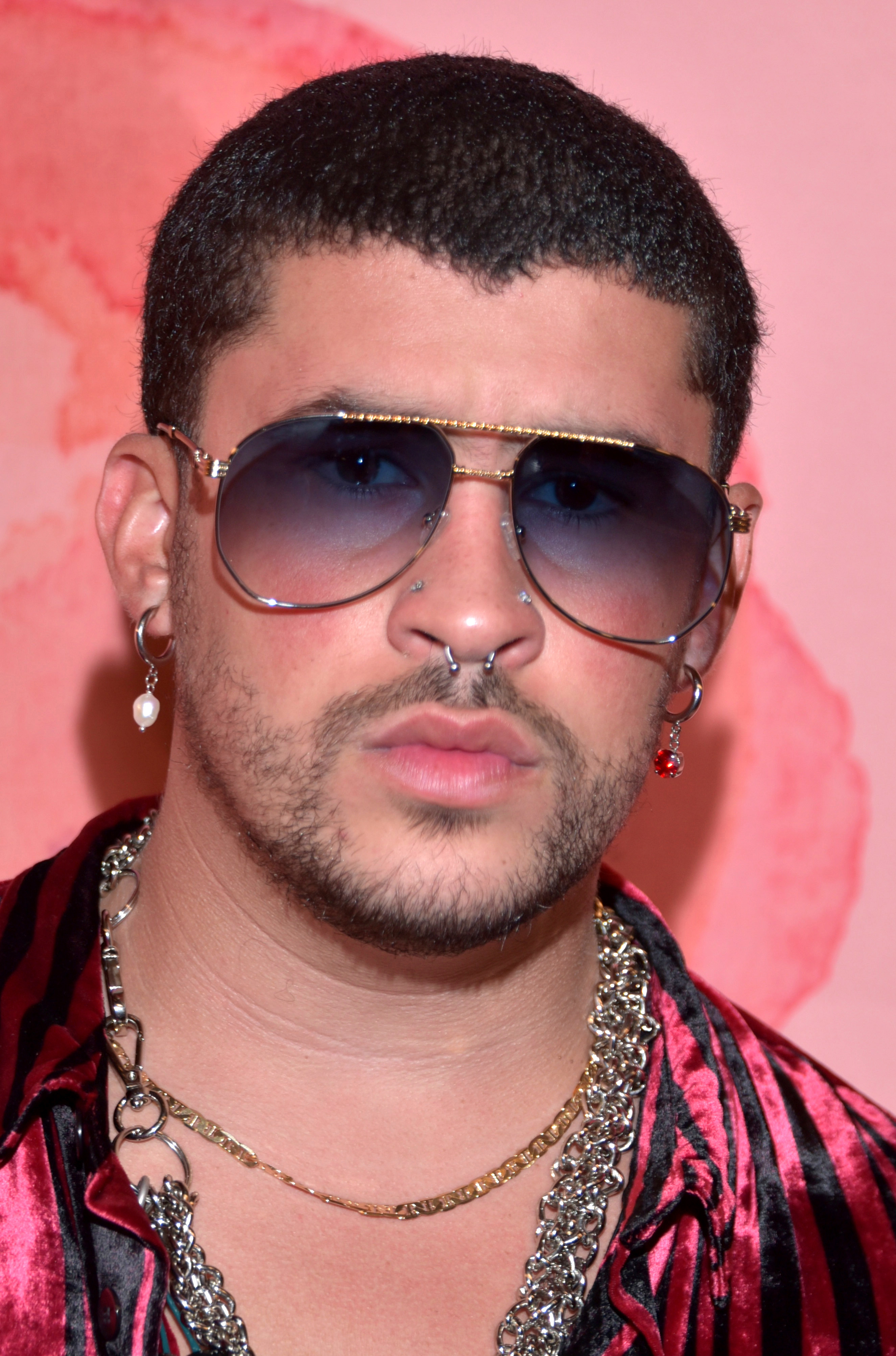
Bad Bunny, rapper

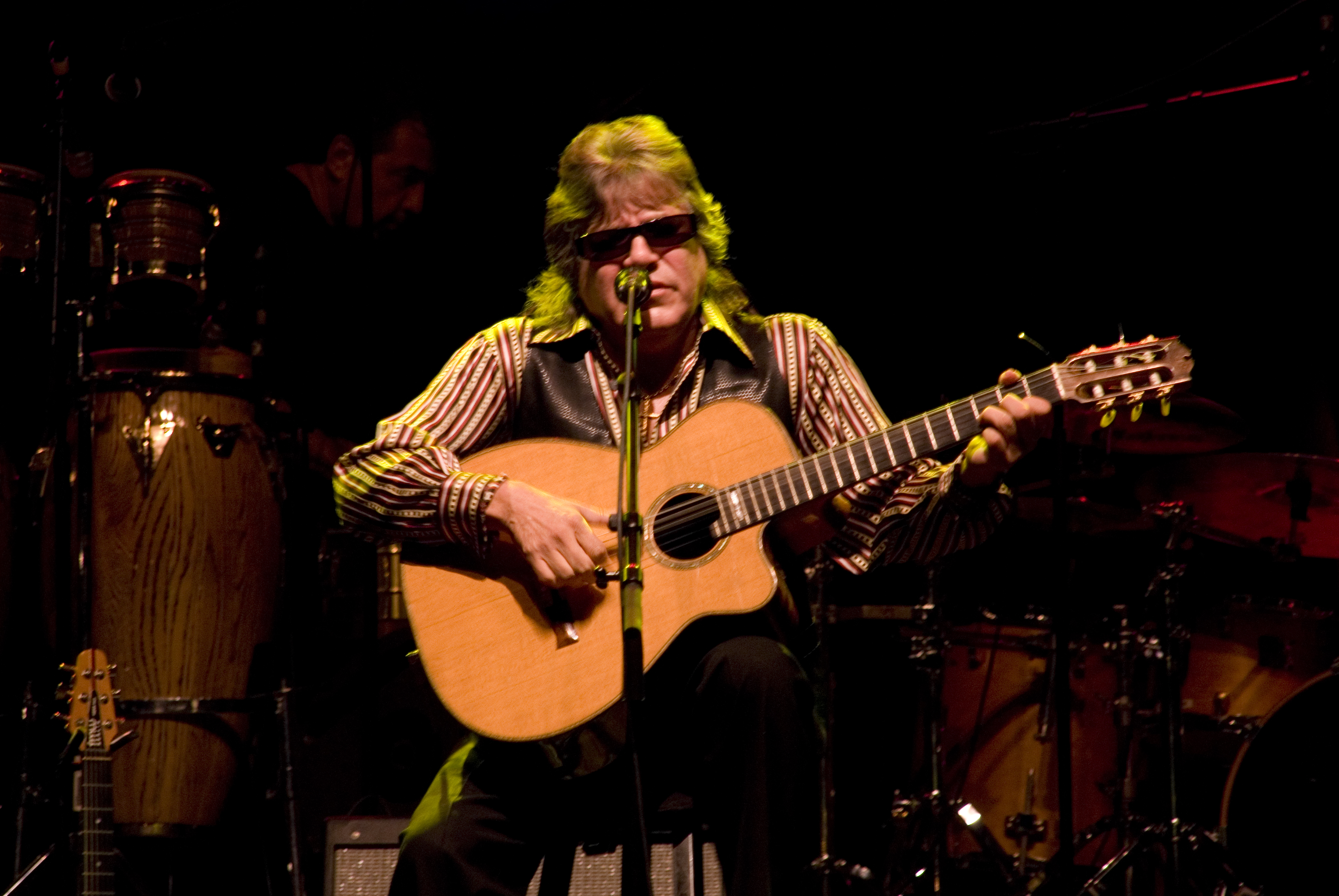
José Feliciano, singer and composer of "Feliz Navidad"

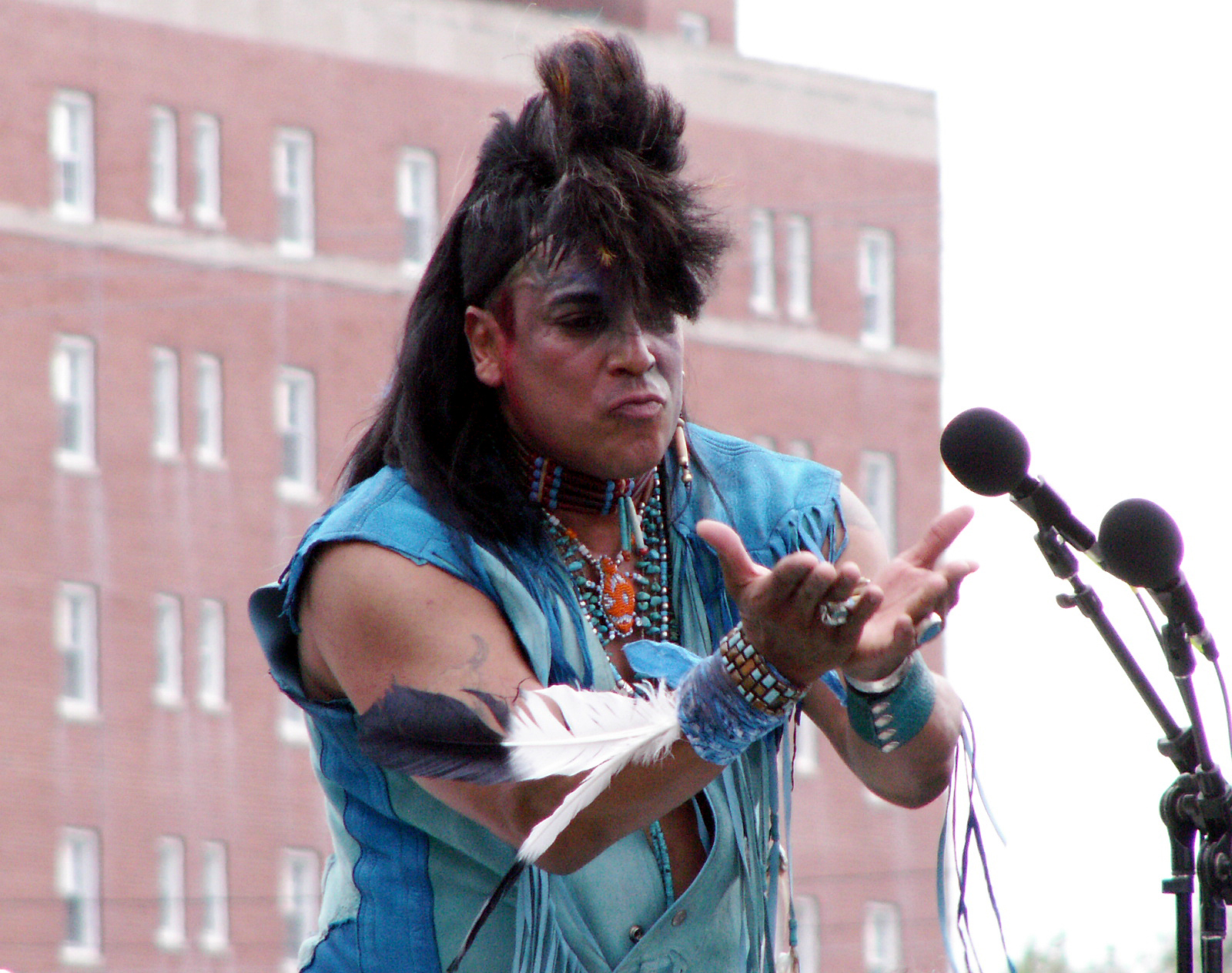
Felipe Rose, Village People

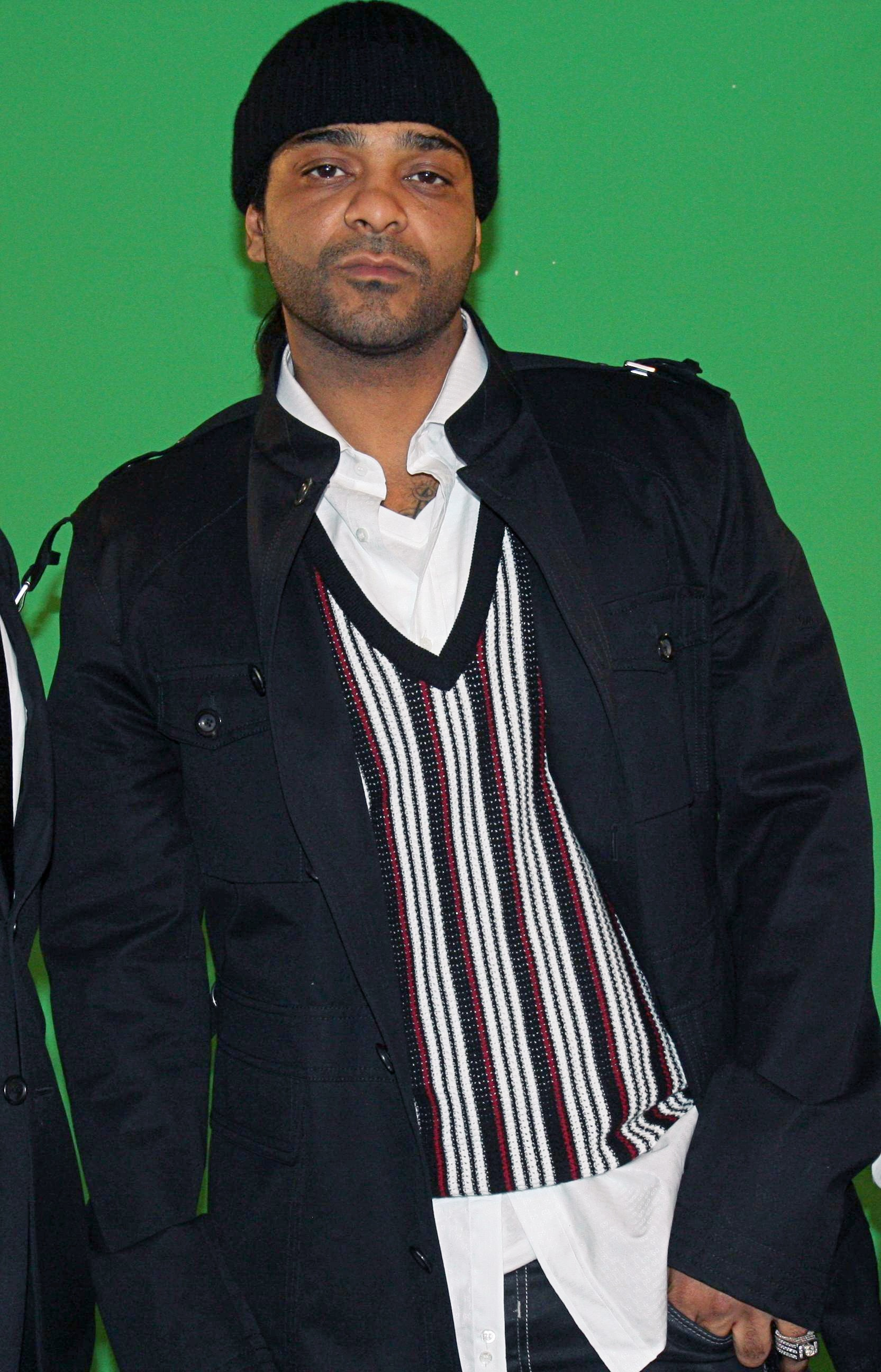
Jim Jones, rapper

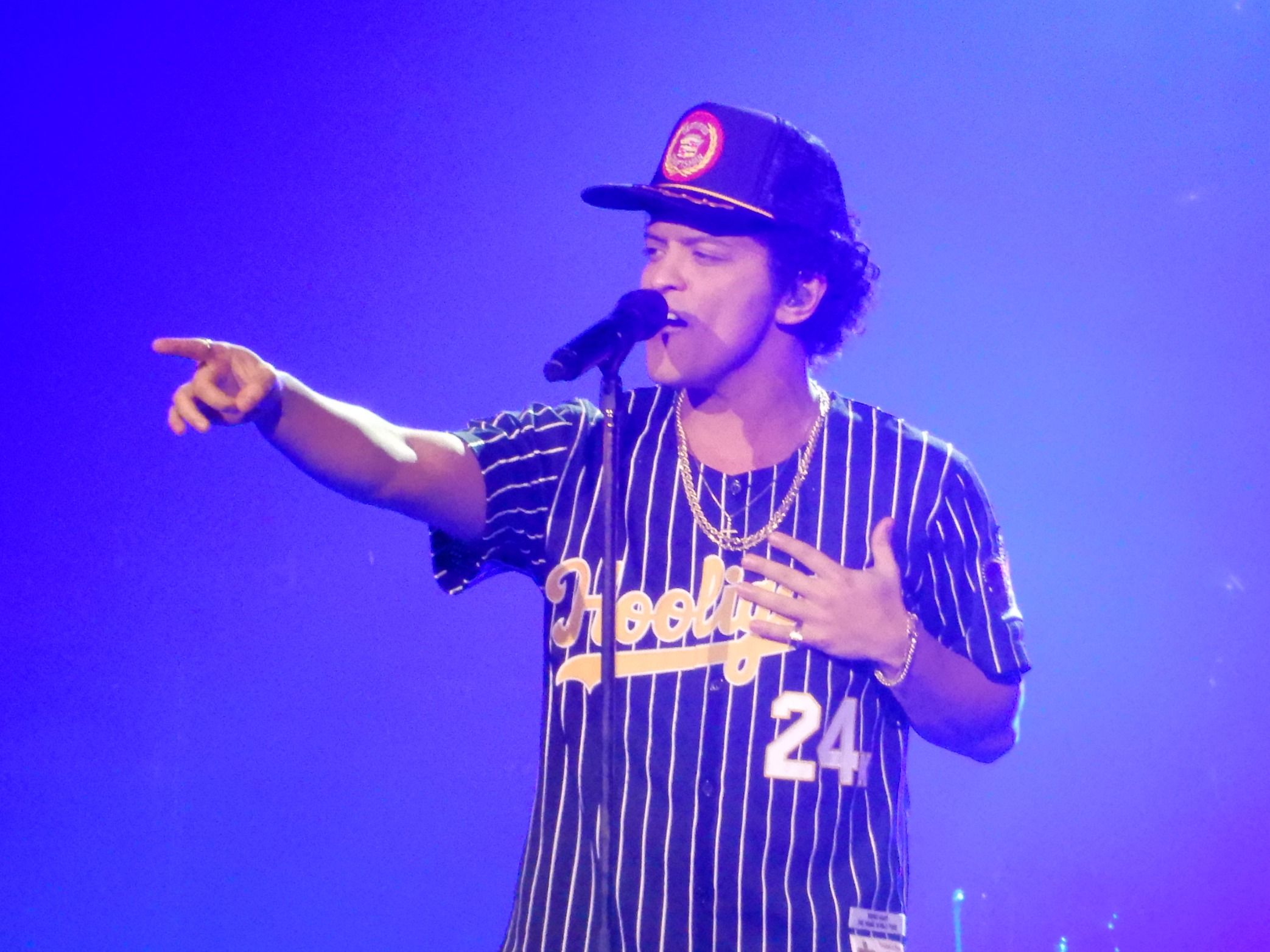
Bruno Mars

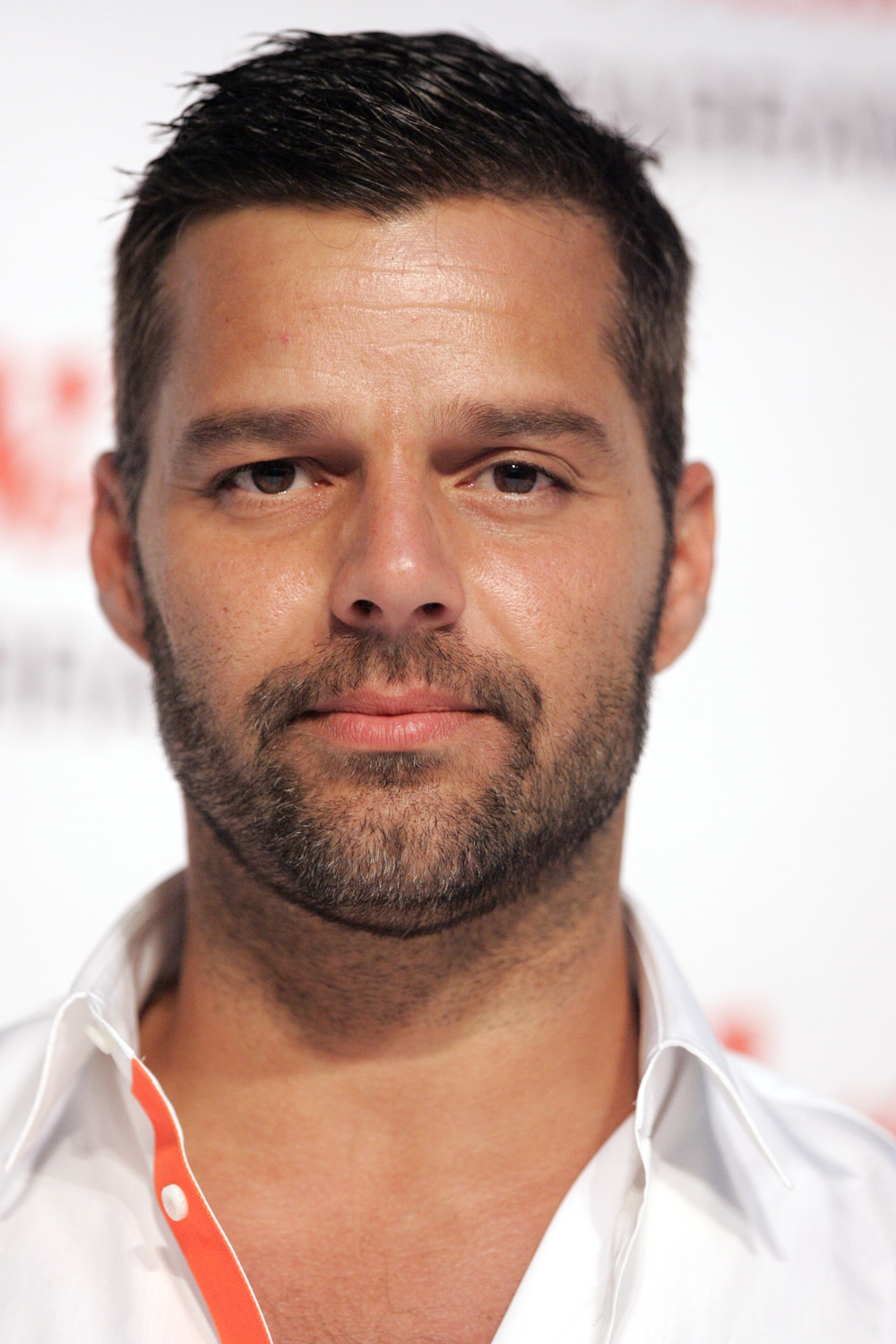
Ricky Martin, singer

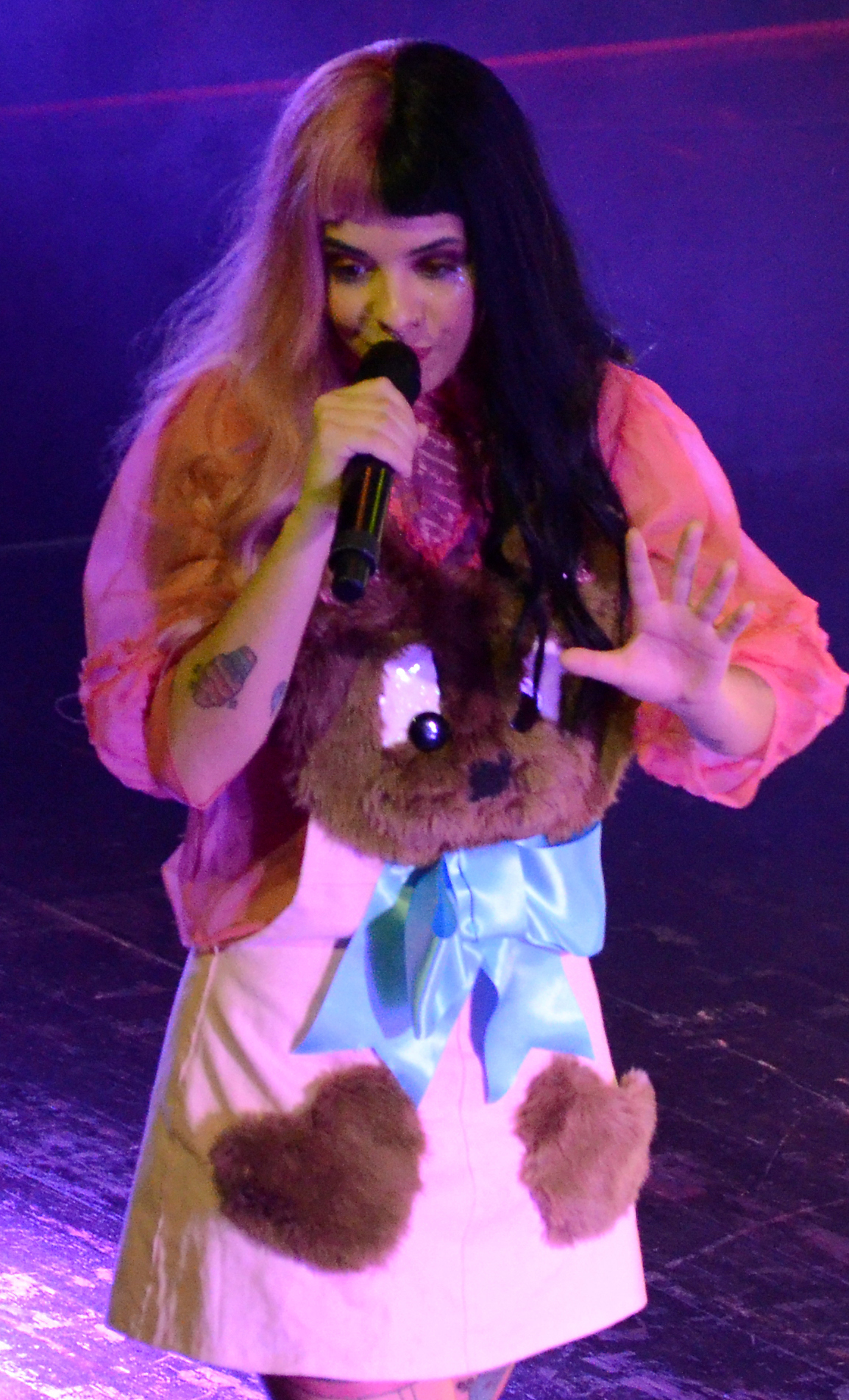
Melanie Martinez, singer

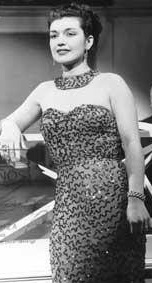
Elsa Miranda, singer

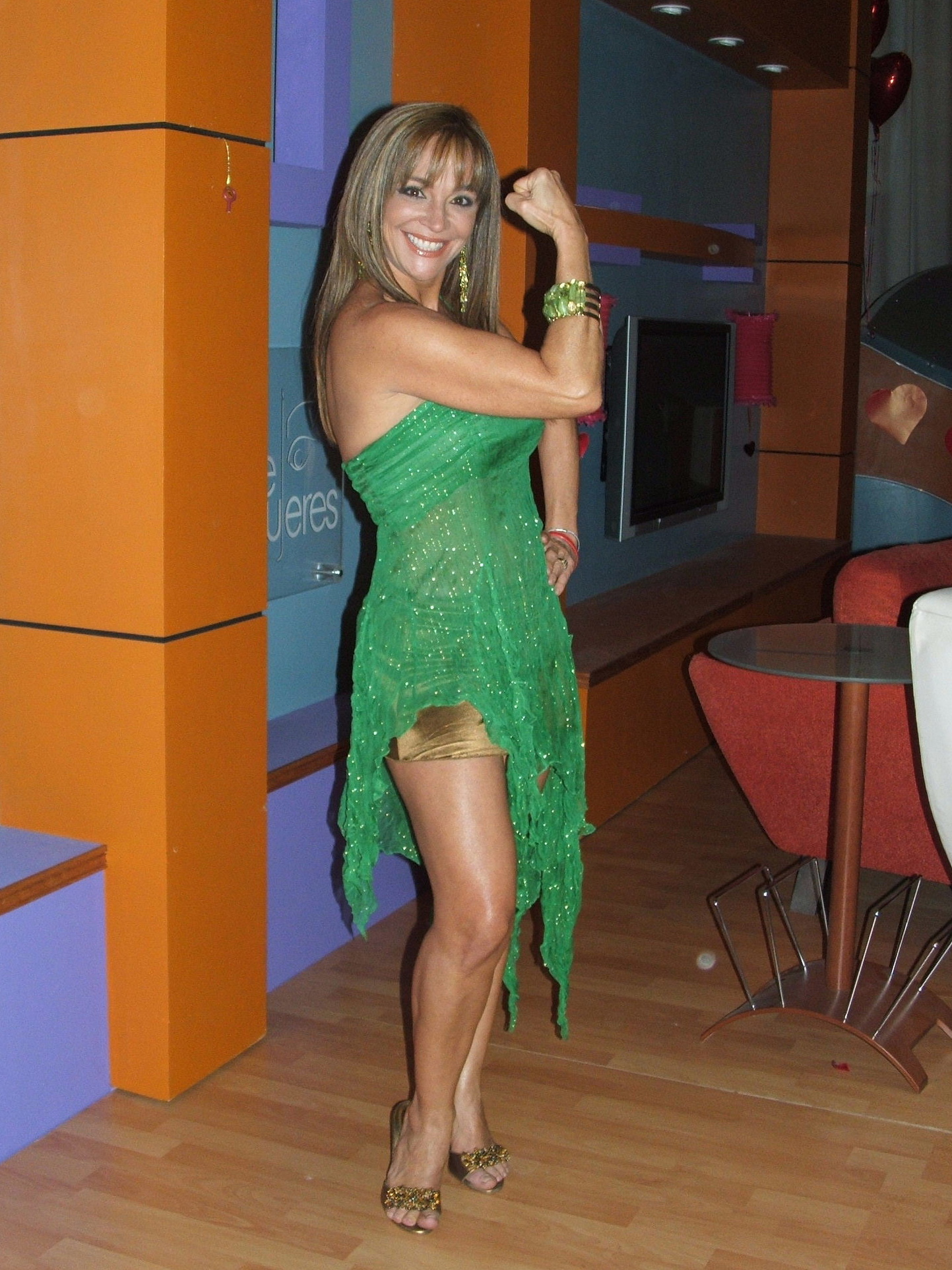
Yolandita Monge, singer

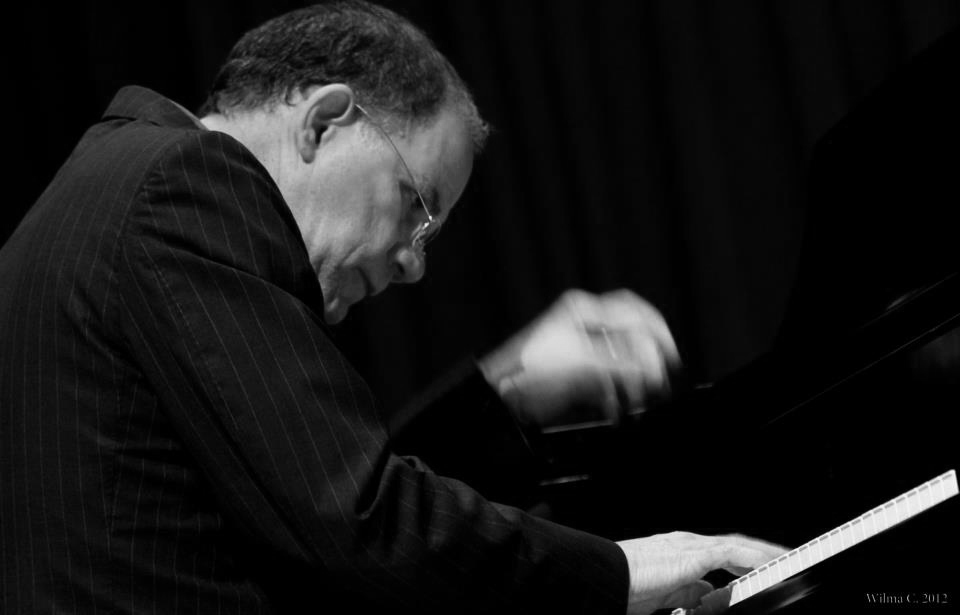
Carli Muñoz, pianist

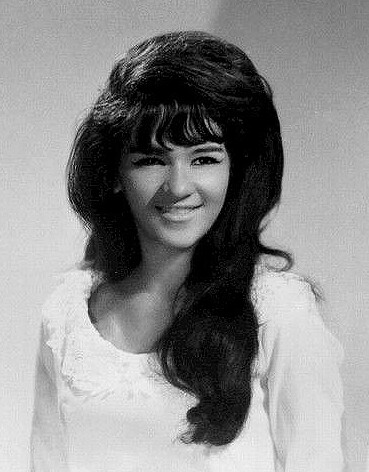
Nedra Talley

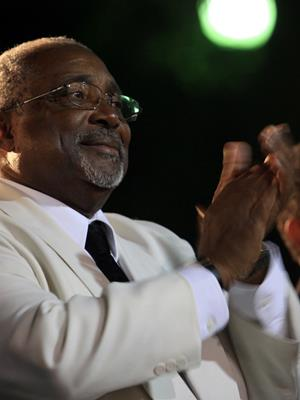
Rubén Colón Tarrats, orchestra conductor

=== A ===
- Anuel AA (born 1992), rapper and singer-songwriter
- César Abreu (born 1977), dancer, singer, actor; former member of Menudo
- Raymond Acevedo (born 1971), singer, actor, visual artist; former member of Menudo and Menudo: La Reunion
- Mary Ann Acevedo Rivera (born 1987), singer, songwriter
- Juan F. Acosta (1890–1968), danza composer
- Johnny Albino (1919–2011), singer
- Rauw Alejandro (born 1993), singer, musician
- Rafael Alers (1903–1978), danza composer; first Puerto Rican to compose a Hollywood musical score
- Carlos Alomar (born 1951), guitarist, composer, arranger, producer
- Zayra Álvarez (born 1974), rock singer-songwriter
- Miguel Ángel Amadeo, composer
- Marc Anthony (born 1968), singer
- Henry Arana (1921–2008), composer
- Chucho Avellanet (born 1941), singer
- Caleb Avilés (born 1978), singer; former member of MDO, and Menudo: La Reunion

=== B ===
- Bad Bunny (born 1994), rapper
- Manolo Badrena (born 1952), percussionist
- Adrienne Bailon (born 1983), singer, actress, songwriter; part of the former girl group trio 3LW, and of The Cheetah Girls
- Puchi Balseiro (1926–2007), composer
- Lloyd Banks (born 1982), rapper (Puerto Rican mother)
- Nessa Barrett (born 2002), singer of Puerto Rican descent
- Ray Barretto (1929–2006), percussionist, jazz and salsa leader
- Eddie Benítez (1956–2019), guitarist
- John Benítez (born 1957), a.k.a. "Jellybean Benítez", music producer and remixer
- Lucecita Benítez (born 1942), a.k.a. "Lucecita", singer
- Samuel Beníquez (born 1971), music producer, composer and musician
- Obie Bermúdez (born 1980), singer and composer
- Big Pun (1971–2000), rapper; first Latino solo rapper to have an album certified Platinum by the RIAA, achieving this milestone with his debut album, Capital Punishment, in 1998
- Andy Blázquez (born 1978), singer; former member of Menudo, MDO, and Menudo: La Reunion
- Sergio Blass (born 1972), singer, songwriter, actor; former member of Menudo and Menudo: La Reunion
- Willie Bobo (1934–1983) (born William Correa), Latin jazz musician and bandleader
- Ángela Bofill (1954–2024), singer (Puerto Rican mother)
- Américo Boschetti (born 1951), singer and composer
- Roy Brown (born 1945), folklore singer, composer
- V V Brown (born 1983), singer

=== C ===
- Antonio Cabán Vale (1942–2024), a.k.a. "El Topo", folklore singer, composer
- Carlos Ruben Pagan Caban (born 1978), singer, guitarist, creator of Curse Inflikted
- Tego Calderón (born 1972), rapper, reggaeton artist
- Héctor Campos Parsi (1922–1998), singer, composer
- Sabrina Claudio (born 1996), singer
- Miguel Cancel (born 1968), singer, actor, retired police officer; former member of Menudo and El Reencuentro
- Bobby Capó (1921–1989), singer, composer
- Nydia Caro (born 1948), singer
- Vicente Carattini (1939–2005), singer and composer; composed many of Puerto Rico's Christmas themes
- Joseph Cartagena (born 1970), a.k.a. "Fat Joe", rapper
- Marta Casals Istomin (born 1936), cellist; former president of the Manhattan School of Music
- Pablo Casals (1876–1973), cellist (Puerto Rican mother), classical musician
- Kevin Ceballo (born 1977), salsa music singer
- Rafael Cepeda (1910–1996), composer; a.k.a. "Patriarch of the Bomba and Plena"
- Iris Chacón (born 1950), singer and vedette
- Keshia Chanté (born 1988), R&B and pop singer-songwriter
- Arístides Chavier Arévalo (1867–1942), pianist and composer
- José Miguel Class (1938–2017), a.k.a. "El Gallito de Manatí", singer
- Robert Clivillés (born 1964), freestyle producer; founder and member of C + C Music Factory
- Javier Colón (born 1978), singer and winner of the first season of U.S. reality series The Voice
- Santos Colón (1922–1998), singer
- Willie Colón (1950–2026), salsa composer
- Rubén Colón Tarrats (born 1940), band director
- César Concepción (1909–1974), orchestra leader
- Ernesto Cordero (born 1946), composer and classical guitarist
- Federico A. Cordero (1928–2012), composer and classical guitarist
- Millie Corretjer (born 1974), singer. She is the granddaughter of Juan Antonio Corretjer, poet and a leader of the Puerto Rican Nationalist Party.
- Rafael Cortijo (1928–1982), bandleader, founder of Cortijo y Su Combo, forerunner of El Gran Combo
- José Cosculluela (born 1980), hip hop and reggaeton artist
- Elvis Crespo (born 1971), merengue singer
- Tony Croatto (1940–2005), singer/composer of Puerto Rican folk songs
- Bobby Cruz (born 1937), salsa singer, bandleader
- Joe Cuba (1931–2009) (born José Calderón), bandleader, a.k.a. "The Father of the Boogaloo"
- Tite Curet Alonso (1926–2003), ballad and salsa composer

=== D ===
- Christian Daniel (born 1984), singer-songwriter
- Iluminado Dávila Medina (1918–2021), cuatrista
- Héctor Delgado (born 1979), a.k.a. "el Father", reggaeton singer
- Rafael José Díaz (born 1955), a.k.a. "Rafael José", singer and television host
- Carmen Delia Dipiní (1927–1998), bolero singer
- Edgardo Díaz (born 1960), founder of the boy band Menudo
- Braulio Dueño Colón (1854–1934), composer of "Canciones Escolares"
- Huey Dunbar (born 1974), singer, member of DLG (Puerto Rican mother)

=== E ===
- Rafi Escudero (born 1945), musician, singer, composer
- Noel Estrada (1918–1979), composer of "En Mi Viejo San Juan"
- Cano Estremera (1958–2020), singer, composer and poet

=== F ===
- Lucy Fabery (1931–2015), singer
- Rene Farrait (born 1967), singer, actor; former member of Menudo
- Cheo Feliciano (1935–2014), salsa singer; singer for Joe Cuba Sextet
- José Feliciano (born 1945), singer, composed "Feliz Navidad"
- Ruth Fernández (1919–2012), singer
- Elmer Figueroa (born 1968), a.k.a. "Chayanne", singer
- Efrain Fines (born 1981), a.k.a. "Tito el Bambino", reggaeton singer
- Narciso Figueroa (1906–2004), composer
- Pedro Flores (1894–1979), composer and bandleader
- Héctor Fonseca (born 1980), producer, musician
- Luis Fonsi (born 1978), singer

=== G ===
- Angelo García (born 1976), singer; former member of Menudo
- Kany García (born 1982), singer-songwriter
- Jenilca Giusti (born 1981), singer, songwriter, actress, model
- Eddie Gómez (born 1944), jazz musician and composer
- Rubén Gómez (born 1974), singer, songwriter, actor; former member of Menudo
- Tito Gómez (1948–2007), composer
- Kenny "Dope" Gonzáles (born 1970), producer, musician; member of Masters At Work

=== H ===
- Edward W. Hardy (born 1992), composer, violinist, violist, producer, and actor, known for his off-Broadway musical The Woodsman
- Hex Hector (born 1965), Grammy Award-winning remixer and producer
- Oscar Hernández (born 1954), salsa musician; composed the musical theme for the television series Sex and the City
- Rafael Hernández Marín (1891–1965), composer
- Sophy Hernández (born 1950), singer
- Giovanni Hidalgo (born 1963), percussionist
- Lee Holdridge (born 1944), television and film score composer

=== I ===
- Rafael Ithier (1926–2025), musician; founder of El Gran Combo orchestra
- Ironmouse singer, entertainer and philanthropist

=== J ===
- Nicky Jam (born 1981), singer-songwriter
- Janid, singer, songwriter, reality TV personality
- Orlando Javier Valle Vega (born 1979), a.k.a. "Chencho", singer, producer
- Carmita Jiménez (1939–2003), a.k.a. "La Dama de la Canción", singer
- Jim Jones (born 1976) (Puerto Rican father)

=== K ===
- Kane & Abel, rap duo
- Tori Kelly (born 1992), singer (father is half Puerto Rican)

=== L ===
- La India (born 1970) (born Linda Caballero), salsa singer
- George Lamond (born 1967), pop/salsa singer
- William Landrón (born 1978), a.k.a. "Don Omar", reggaeton singer
- Tito Lara (1932–1987), singer
- Héctor Lavoe (1946–1993), salsa singer
- Raphy Leavitt (1948–2015), composer, musical director
- Elizabeth le Fey, singer, songwriter
- Manny Lehman, music producer, DJ
- Lisa M (born 1974), rapper
- Jennifer López (born 1969), singer (both parents are Puerto Rican)
- Ricky López (born 1980), singer; former member of Menudo and MDO
- Johnny Lozada (born 1967), singer, actor, host; former member of Menudo, Proyecto M and El Reencuentro
- Luis Lozada (born 1971), rapper
- Papo Lucca (born 1946), pianist
- Lunna (born 1947), singer

=== M ===
- Manny Manuel (born 1972), singer
- Víctor Manuelle (born 1968), salsa singer
- Bruno Mars (born 1985), singer and songwriter (father is Puerto Rican)
- Ricky Martin (born 1971), singer; former member of Menudo
- Angie Martínez (born 1972), singer, actress, radio personality
- Ladislao Martínez (1898–1979), virtuoso cuatro player known as "El Maestro Ladí"
- Melanie Martínez (born 1995), Puerto Rican-Dominican singer-songwriter
- Carolyne Mas (born 1955), singer-songwriter, musician, and performer
- Charlie Masso (born 1969), singer; former member of Menudo
- Paul Masvidal (born 1971), guitarist, singer, and songwriter with international recording artists Cynic
- Maxwell (born 1973), R&B and neo-soul singer (Puerto Rican father)
- Lisette Meléndez (born 1967), freestyle/Latin-pop singer
- Carlos Meléndez (born 1965), architect, singer; former member of Menudo
- Óscar Meléndez (born 1966), singer, lawyer; former member of Menudo
- Ricky Meléndez (born 1967), singer, actor, lawyer; former member of Menudo and El Reencuentro
- Syesha Mercado (born 1987), singer and finalist on American Idol (Puerto Rican father)
- Julia Michaels (born 1993), singer, songwriter (Mexican-Puerto Rican father)
- Luis Miguel (born 1970), a.k.a. "sol de Mexico", singer and songwriter
- Young Miko (born 1997), rapper, singer/songwriter
- Elsa Miranda (1922–2007), singer who was featured on radio and television in the United States during the Golden Age of Radio in the 1940s
- Ismael Miranda (born 1950), "El Niño Bonito de la Salsa", singer and composer, Fania All-Star
- Lin-Manuel Miranda (born 1980), Grammy-, Tony-, and MacArthur "Genius" Award-winning composer, lyricist, and actor, known for his Broadway musicals In the Heights and Hamilton
- Ángel Mislán (1862–1911), composer of danzas
- José Luis Moneró (1921–2011), composer and band leader
- Yolandita Monge (born 1955), singer, television host and theatrical actress
- Gilberto Monroig (1930–1996), bolero singer
- Glenn Monroig (born 1957), composer, singer; sang the first rap song in Spanish
- Andy Montáñez (born 1942), salsa singer
- David Morales (born 1962), deejay, composer, and music producer
- Florencio Morales Ramos (1915–1989), a.k.a. "Ramito", composer of plenas and one of the foremost singers of música jíbara; composed "Que Bonita Bandera", which, on March 19, 2009, served as the wake-up call for Puerto Rican astronaut Joseph M. Acaba and the crew aboard the Discovery Space Shuttle
- Mark Morales (1968–2021), a.k.a. "Prince Markie Dee", rapper, and producer
- Noro Morales (1911–1964), pianist, composer, arranger and bandleader
- Juan Morel Campos (1857–1896), composer of danzas; uncle of Pedro Albizu Campos
- Carli Muñoz (born 1948), pianist, composer, arranger, bandleader, and producer
- Rafael Muñoz (1900–1961), orchestra leader; in 1934, he composed the musical score for Romance Tropical, the first Puerto Rican movie with sound and the second Spanish movie with sound in the world

=== N ===
- Ednita Nazario (born 1955), singer
- Rafael Nazario (born 1952), pianist, composer and arranger, actor, chef, author and occasional wine writer
- Joe Negroni (1940–1978), Rock and Roll Hall of Famer, member of The Teenagers
- Tito Nieves (born 1958), salsa singer; his version of "I Like it Like That" was part of a national Burger King commercial
- Noelia (born 1979), singer, songwriter and actress
- Nova y Jory, reggaeton duo

=== O ===
- Tommy Olivencia (1938–2006), salsa bandleader, trumpet player, singer
- Tony Orlando (born 1944), singer (Puerto Rican mother)
- Choco Orta (born 1977), salsa singer
- Jeannie Ortega (born 1986), R&B and reggaeton singer
- Claudette Ortiz (born 1981), singer, R&B group City High
- Joell Ortiz (born 1980), rapper
- Luis "Perico" Ortiz (born 1949), salsa singer, trumpeter, composer, musical arranger and producer
- Shalim Ortiz (born 1979), a.k.a. "Shalim", singer, actor
- Pedro Ortiz Davila (1912–1986), a.k.a. "Davilita", bolero singer; advocate of Puerto Rican independence
- Juan Carlos Ozuna Rosado (born 1992), a.k.a. "Ozuna", reggaeton and Latin trap singer

=== P ===
- Charlie Palmieri (1926–1988), pianist, bandleader
- Eddie Palmieri (born 1936), pianist, composer, bandleader; 2013 National Endowment of Arts Jazz Master; nine-time Grammy Award winner
- José Enrique Pedreira (1904–1959), danza composer
- Ángel "Cuco" Peña (born 1948), musician, composer and producer
- René Pérez (born 1978), singer, member of Calle 13
- Lourdes Pérez (born 1961), singer, songwriter; folk, nueva canción, and nueva trova singer
- Martha Pesante (born 1972), a.k.a. "Ivy Queen" and "The Queen of Reggaeton", reggaeton singer
- Robert Phillips, (born 1953, mother was Puerto Rican) guitarist
- Plan B, reggaeton duo
- Carlos Ponce (born 1972), singer
- Rebeca Pous Del Toro (born 1978), Spanish pop singer; cousin of Benicio del Toro
- Miguel Poventud (1942–1983), a.k.a. "El Nino Prodigio de Guayama" and "Miguelito"; musician, singer and composer of boleros
- Tito Puente (1923–2000), musician, composer, arranger and producer, a.k.a. the "King of Latin Music" or "the Mambo King"

=== Q ===
- Ismael Quintana (1937–2016), salsa singer, lead vocalist with Eddie Palmeri's original band La Perfecta
- José Ignacio Quintón (1881–1925), pianist and composer of danzas
- Domingo Quiñones (born 1963), singer, actor
- Luciano Quiñones (born 1948), danza composer

=== R ===
- Chamaco Ramírez (1941–1983), salsa singer
- Richie Ray (born 1945), a.k.a. "The King of Salsa", singer, composer
- Sylvia Rexach (1922–1961), singer, composer
- Ray Reyes (1970–2021), singer, member of Menudo and Proyecto M
- Ron Reyes (born 1960), singer for Black Flag, 1979–1980
- Augie Rios (1946–2019), a musician best known for the song "¿Dónde Está Santa Claus?"
- Juan Ríos Ovalle (1863–1928), composer of danzas, musician and orchestra director
- Gabriel Ríos (born 1978), musician
- Gerardo Rivas (born 1982), salsa singer
- Danny Rivera (born 1945), singer
- Ismael Rivera (1931–1987), a.k.a. "El Sonero Mayor", salsa singer
- Jerry Rivera (born 1973), salsa singer; first salsa artist to perform on The Tonight Show
- Jorge Rivera-Herrans (born 1998), composer, lyricist, singer. Known for Epic: The Musical
- Mon Rivera (1899–1978), trombonist and singer
- Tomás Rivera Morales (1927–2001), a.k.a. "Maso Rivera", composer; child music prodigy who composed over 1,000 instrumental compositions for the cuatro, among which he treasured the waltz; considered to be a virtuoso cuatrista
- R.K.M & Ken-Y, reggaeton duo
- Augusto Rodríguez (1904–1993), composer and chorus director; founder of the choir of the University of Puerto Rico
- Chino Rodriguez (1954–2022), salsa musician, trombonist, composer, artist manager, producer, talent agent; founder of Oriente Music Group and Latin Music Booking (Puerto Rican mother, Chinese father)
- Daniel Rodríguez (born 1964), former police officer turned operatic tenor
- Felipe Rodríguez (1926–1999), a.k.a. "La Voz", singer of boleros
- Julito Rodríguez (1925–2013), singer and leader of one of the most important tríos
- Lalo Rodríguez (1958–2022), salsa singer; was part of the first two records to win the first two Latin Grammy Awards; first artist to sell over one million salsa records in Spain
- Pellin Rodríguez (1926–1984), salsa singer; member of the musical group El Gran Combo was related to Gilberto Concepción de Gracia, founder of the Partido Independentista Puertorriqueño (Puerto Rican Independence Party)
- Rafael "Ralphy" Rodríguez (born 1973), singer, songwriter, musician, actor, producer; former member of Menudo
- Tito Rodríguez (1923–1973), singer and bandleader
- Pete "El Conde" Rodríguez (1933–2000), salsa singer, Fania All-Star
- Omar Rodríguez-López (born 1975), composer and guitarist
- Roberto Roena (1940–2021), percussionist and band leader
- Kelis Rogers (born 1979), singer and television host (Chinese-Puerto Rican mother)
- Tito Rojas (1955–2020), salsa singer
- Ivette Román-Roberto, experimental vocalist
- Marta Romero (1928–2013), singer and actress
- Draco Rosa, singer, composer
- Ralphi Rosario (born 1959), producer, DJ, musician
- Willie Rosario (born 1924), composer, timbalero, bandleader
- Felipe Rose (born 1954), singer
- Julita Ross (1919–1981), singer of danzas
- Roy Rosselló (born 1970), singer, former member of Menudo
- Frankie Ruiz (1958–1998), salsa singer
- Hilton Ruiz (1952–2006), jazz composer/musician
- Maelo Ruiz (born 1966), salsa singer

=== S ===
- Jimmy Sabater Sr. (1936–2012), musician; three-time winner of the ACE Awards
- Fernando and Nefty Sallaberry (born 1964, born 1965), singers; former members of Menudo
- Bobby Sanabria (born 1957), Latin jazz musician, drummer, percussionist, composer, arranger, 8X Grammy nominee as a leader, educator, documentary film producer
- Claudio Sánchez (born 1978), singer; lead singer, lyricist and guitarist of Coheed and Cambria
- Jesús María Sanromá (1902–1984), composer; first person to be named official pianist of the Boston Symphony Orchestra
- Gilberto Santa Rosa (born 1962), salsa singer
- Daniel Santos (1916–1992), composer, singer of boleros and Cuban guarachas; he was an advocate of Puerto Rican independence.
- Ray Santos (1928–2019), arranger and composer, saxophonist, Grammy winner, The Mambo Kings
- Romeo Santos (born 1981), bachata singer; former member of Aventura (Puerto Rican mother)
- Adalberto Santiago (born 1937), salsa singer
- Eddie Santiago (born 1955), salsa singer
- Herman Santiago (born 1941), rock n roll singer and Hall of Famer; composed song "Why Do Fools Fall in Love"
- Marvin Santiago (1947–2004), salsa singer
- Dr. Zoraida Santiago (born 1952), singer and composer
- Nino Segarra (born 1954), salsa singer
- Ray Sepúlveda, salsa singer
- Xavier Serbiá (born 1968), singer; former member of "Menudo
- Roberto Sierra (born 1953), classical music composer, famous for his Missa Latina
- Myrta Silva (1917–1987), a.k.a. "La Gorda de Oro" and "Madame Chencha", singer, composer
- Arturo Somohano (1910–1977), composer; symphony orchestra conductor
- Ivette Sosa (born 1976), singer; member of Eden's Crush
- Brenda K. Starr (born 1966), salsa singer (Puerto Rican mother)
- Michael Stuart (born 1975), salsa singer
- Sweet Sensation, freestyle trio

=== T ===
- Nedra Talley (born 1946), singer, member of "The Ronettes", who were inducted into the Rock n Roll Hall of Fame in 2007
- Olga Tañón (born 1967), singer, composer
- Manuel Gregorio Tavárez (1843–1883), composer, known as "The Father of the Puerto Rican danza"
- Gerardo Teissonniere (born 1961), classical pianist and teacher
- Daniel Ticotin (born 1969), singer and musician
- Termanology (born 1982), rapper
- Juan Tizol (1900–1984), jazz musician and composer, extended period with Duke Ellington
- TKA, freestyle trio
- Ray Toro (born 1977), lead guitarist (My Chemical Romance)
- Yomo Toro (1933–2012), musician, guitarist, and "cuatrista"
- Eladio Torres (born 1950), musician, singer and composer*
- Harold "Chico" Torres (died 2024), singer, member of the doo-wop group The Crests who had a #1 hit with the song "16 Candles".
- Manoella Torres (born 1954), singer
- Néstor Torres (born 1957), musician; Latin Grammy Award-winning preeminent flautist in the Latin jazz genre
- Rawy Torres (born 1975), singer, composer, guitarist; former member of Menudo
- Tommy Torres (born 1971), singer, composer, musician
- Tony Touch (born 1969), singer

=== V ===
- Yolanda Vadiz (1959–1987), gospel singer
- Gary Valenciano (born 1964), Filipino musician (Puerto Rican mother)
- Bobby Valentín (born 1941), musician, bandleader
- José Vázquez-Cofresí (born 1975), bandleader, musician, composer and producer
- Mario Vázquez (born 1977), pop and R&B singer; 2005 American Idol
- Myrna Vázquez (1935–1975), actress and activist
- Little Louie Vega (born 1965), producer, musician; member of Masters At Work
- Tony Vega (born 1957), salsa singer
- Lisa Vélez (born 1967), singer of Lisa Lisa and Cult Jam
- Norberto_Vélez (born 1979), salsa singer, composer, producer, arranger and entertainer
- Wilkins Vélez (born 1953), a.k.a. "Wilkins", singer and composer

=== W ===
- Wisin & Yandel, reggaeton duo, known as "El Duo de la Historia"

=== Y ===
- Yaga y Mackie, reggaeton duo
- Daddy Yankee (born Ramón Ayala) (born 1977), reggaeton singer
- Yomo (born 1981), reggaeton artist

=== Z ===
- Zabdiel de Jesús (born 1997), singer
- Miguel Zenón (born 1976), jazz saxophonist
- Zion y Lennox, reggaeton duo
- María Zardoya, lead singer of The Marías

=== Opera ===
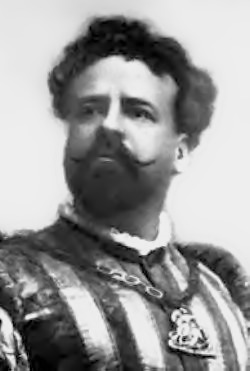
Antonio Paolí

- Martina Arroyo (1937―2026), operatic soprano; part of the first generation of black opera singers to achieve wide success
- Justino Díaz (born 1940), opera singer
- Pablo Elvira (1937–2000), baritone, opera singer
- Benjamín Marcantoni, operatic countertenor
- Ana María Martínez (born 1971), soprano
- Julia Migenes (born 1949), soprano
- Amalia Paoli (1861–1941), soprano
- Antonio Paolí (1871–1946), tenor
- Melliangee Pérez (born 1976), opera soprano; awarded Soprano of the Year by UNESCO
- Graciela Rivera (1921–2011), soprano; first Puerto Rican to sing a lead role in the Metropolitan Opera

== Criminals and outlaws ==
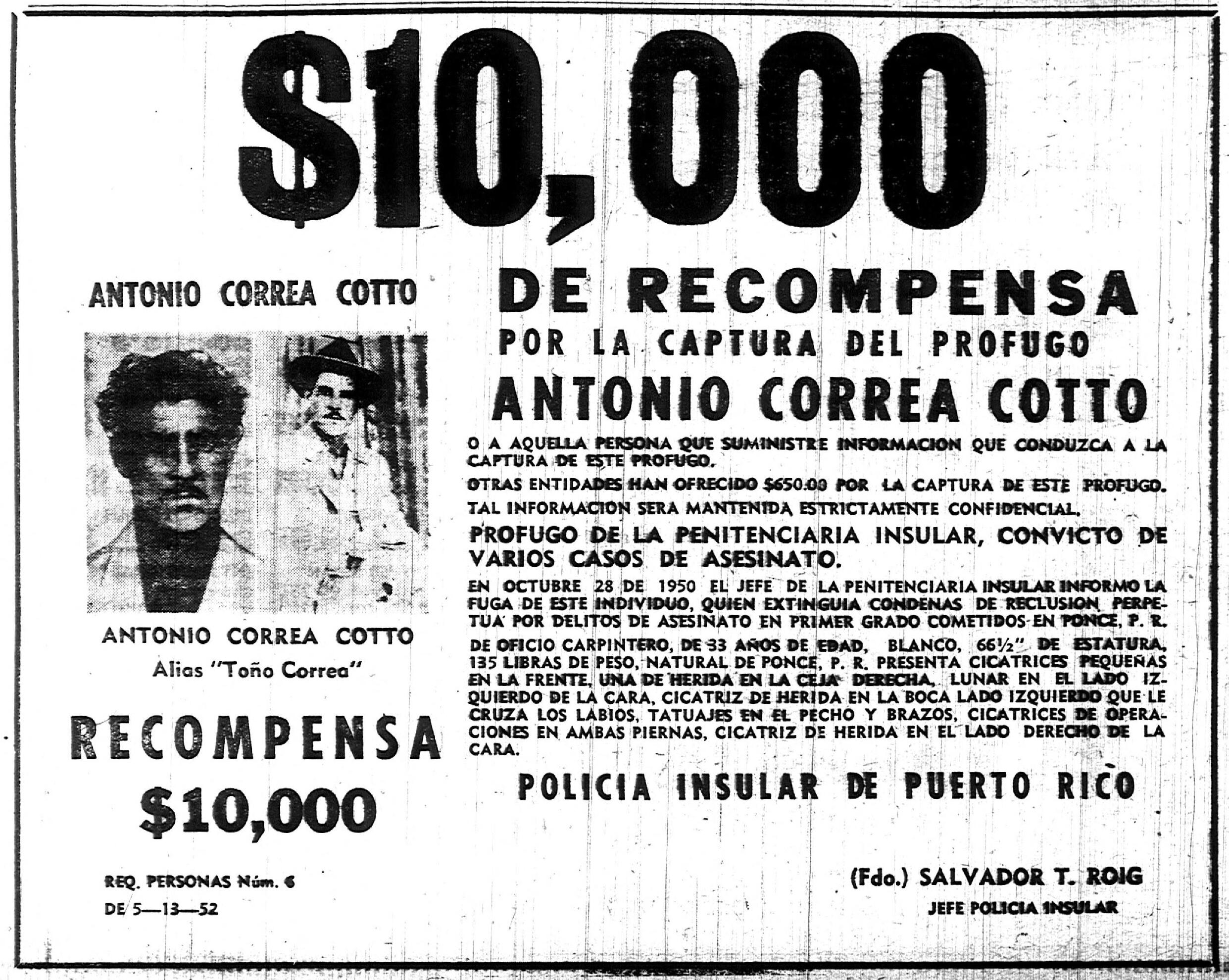
A $10,000 reward was offered for the capture of Puerto Rican murderer Antonio Correa Cotto.

Pre-20th century

- Roberto Cofresí (1791–1825), a.k.a. '"El Pirata Cofresí"' (Cofresí the Pirate); his exploits as a pirate are part of Puerto Rico's folklore

20th century

- Salvador Agrón (1943–1986), a.k.a. "The Capeman", criminal and poet
- Antonio Correa Cotto (1916–1952), bandit/outlaw
- Jose Garcia Cosme (1957–2019), a.k.a. "Papo Cachete", drug kingpin
- Antonio García López (1943–1995), a.k.a. "Toño Bicicleta", outlaw
- Raymond Márquez (born 1930), a.k.a. "Spanish Raymond", Harlem numbers kingpin
- Isabel la Negra (1901–1974), madam of a brothel
- Edsel Torres Gómez, a.k.a. "Negri", drug kingpin
- Tony Tursi (1901–1989), mobster

21st century

- José Figueroa Agosto (born 1964), drug kingpin; and porn star known as "the Pablo Escobar of the Caribbean"
- Ariel Castro (1960–2013), kidnapper
- José Padilla (born 1970), convicted Al-Qaeda operative
- Esteban Santiago (born 1990), Fort Lauderdale shooter
- Alex Trujillo (born 1983), drug dealer and preacher

== Diplomats ==
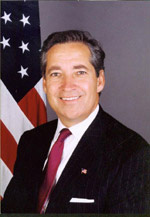
Hans Hertell

20th century

- Adrian A. Basora (born 1938), former U.S. Ambassador to the Czech Republic
- Gabriel Guerra-Mondragón (born 1942), former U.S. Ambassador to Chile
- Luis Guinot (1935–2022), former U.S. Ambassador to Costa Rica
- Victor Marrero (born 1941), former U.S. Ambassador to the OAS
- Spencer Matthews King (1917–1988), former U.S. Ambassador to Guyana
- Edward G. Miller Jr. (1911–1968), lawyer who served as Assistant Secretary of State for Inter-American Affairs from 1949 to 1952
- Teodoro Moscoso (1910–1992), former U.S. Ambassador to Venezuela and head of Alliance for Progress (see also "Politicians")
- Horacio Rivero (1910–2000), Admiral (Ret.), former U.S. Ambassador to Spain (see also "Military")

21st century

- Mari Carmen Aponte (born 1946), U.S. Ambassador to El Salvador
- César Benito Cabrera (born 1947), former U.S. Ambassador to Mauritius and the Seychelles
- Hans Hertell, former U.S. Ambassador to the Dominican Republic

== Educators ==
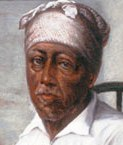
Rafael Cordero

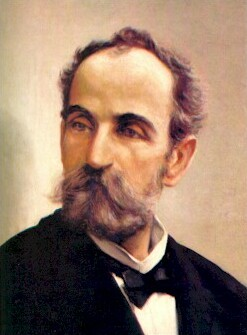
Eugenio María de Hostos

Angel M. Ramos

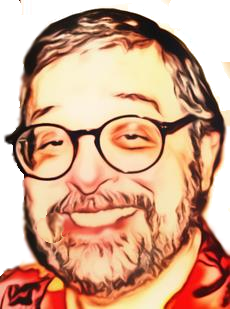
Drawing of Angelo Falcón

- Ursula Acosta, educator; one of the founding members of the Sociedad Puertorriqueña de Genealogía (Puerto Rican Genealogical Society)
- Alfredo M. Aguayo, educator and writer; established the first laboratory of child psychology at the University of Havana
- Carlos Albizu Miranda, psychologist, educator; first Hispanic educator to have a North American university renamed in his honor and one of the first Hispanics to earn a PhD in psychology in the US
- Margot Arce de Vázquez, educator; founder of the department of Hispanic studies in the University of Puerto Rico
- Rosario Bellber González, educator, social worker, women's rights activist, suffragist, and philanthropist; initiator, vice president and one of the founders of the Puerto Rico Teachers Association (Spanish: Asociación de Maestros de Puerto Rico); Bellber is also one of the founders of the Children's Hospital of Puerto Rico (Spanish: Hospital del Niño de Puerto Rico) and president of the Social League of Suffragists of Puerto Rico (Spanish: La Liga Social Sufragista (LSS) de Puerto Rico); In 1944, Bellber founded the House of Health and Convalescence for Children with Tuberculosis (Spanish: Sanatorio para Niños con Tuberculosis) in the mountain town of Aibonito
- Jaime Benítez, former resident commissioner; longest-serving chancellor and president of the University of Puerto Rico
- Frank Bonilla, educator; academic who became a leading figure in Puerto Rican studies
- Emma Brossard, professor of politics and government at the Louisiana State University and noted expert on the Venezuelan oil industry
- Rafael Cartagena Ródriguez, educator and former Secretary of Education of Puerto Rico
- Carlos E. Chardón Palacios, first Puerto Rican mycologist and first Puerto Rican appointed as chancellor of the University of Puerto Rico
- Carlos A. Chardón López, educator and public administrator; the only Puerto Rican to serve twice as Puerto Rico Secretary of Education
- Edna Coll, educator and author; president of the Society of Puerto Rican Authors in San Juan; founder of the Academy of Fine Arts in Puerto Rico
- Celestina Cordero, educator; in 1820, founded the first school for girls in Puerto Rico
- Rafael Cordero, educator; declared venerable in 2004 by Pope John Paul II; the process for beatification is now in motion with Benedictine Fr. Oscar Rivera as Procurator of the Cause
- Waded Cruzado, first Hispanic president of Montana State University
- Eugenio María de Hostos, educator; in Peru, he helped to develop that country's educational system and spoke against the harsh treatment given to the Chinese who lived there. He stayed in Chile from 1870 to 1873. During his stay there, he taught at the University of Chile and gave a speech titled "The Scientific Education of Women;" he proposed that governments permit women in their colleges; soon after, Chile allowed women to enter its college educational system (see also "Politicians" and "Authors).
- Angelo Falcón, political scientist; author of Atlas of Stateside Puerto Ricans (2004); co-editor of Boricuas in Gotham: Puerto Ricans in the Making of Modern New York City (2004)
- José Ferrer Canales, educator, writer and activist
- Megh R. Goyal, professor, historian, scientist; "father of irrigation engineering in Puerto Rico"; professor in agricultural and biomedical engineering at University of Puerto Rico
- Sonia Gutierrez, American educator and Hispanic rights activist; principal, counselor and advocate for adult students at the Carlos Rosario International Public Charter School, an adult charter school in Washington, D.C.
- Felix V. Matos Rodriguez, educator; chancellor of the City University of New York
- Concha Meléndez, educator, writer, poet
- Ana G. Méndez, educator; founder of the Ana G. Méndez University System
- Ingrid Montes, educator, professor of chemistry at the University of Puerto Rico, Río Piedras
- Antonio Miró Montilla, architect, educator; first architect appointed head of a government agency, the Puerto Rico Public Buildings Authority, 1969–71; first dean of the School of Architecture at the University of Puerto Rico, Río Piedras Campus, 1971–78; chancellor of the Río Piedras Campus of the University of Puerto Rico, 1978–85
- Antonia Pantoja, educator; founder of ASPIRA; awarded the Presidential Medal of Freedom
- Ángel Ramos, educator; superintendent of the Sequoia Schools for the Deaf and Hard of Hearing; one of the few deaf Hispanics to earn a doctorate from Gallaudet University
- Juan A. Rivero, educator; founded the Dr. Juan A. Rivero Zoo in Mayagüez; discovered numerous animal species and has written several books
- Havidan Rodriguez, educator and scholar; president of the University at Albany, SUNY, 2017–present; first Latino/Hispanic President of any four-year SUNY institution
- Ana Roque, educator and suffragist; one of the founders of the University of Puerto Rico
- Carlos E. Santiago, economist and educator; chancellor of the University of Wisconsin-Milwaukee
- Ninfa Segarra, New York City Council member; president of the New York City Board of Education, 2000–02
- Victoria Leigh Soto, educator who emerged as a hero in the tragic shooting at Sandy Hook Elementary School in Newtown, Connecticut, when she hid students and died trying to protect them from alleged shooter Adam Lanza; her father is Puerto Rican
- Lolita Tizol, early 1900s educator; at a time when most people in Ponce, as most of Puerto Rico, did not know how to read and write, and when teachers were paid only $50 per month, even in the large cities, Tizol took it upon herself to overcome all challenges to help others
- Nilita Vientós Gastón, educator; first female lawyer to work for the Department of Justice of Puerto Rico; defended the use of the Spanish language in the courts of Puerto Rico, before the Supreme Court, and won
- Mariano Villaronga Toro, educator and public servant; first commissioner of public instruction after the creation of the Estado Libre Asociado; instituted the use of Spanish as the official language of instruction in the Puerto Rico public education system, displacing English, which had been pushed by the US-appointed colonial governors

== Governors of Puerto Rico ==
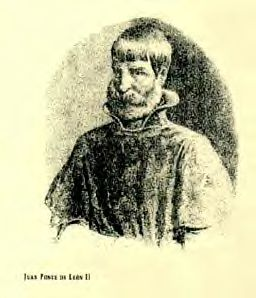
Juan Ponce de León II

Pre-20th century

- Juan Ponce de León, lived with his family in Puerto Rico; Spanish explorer and conquistador; became the first Governor of Puerto Rico by appointment of the Spanish crown; led the first European expedition to Florida, which he named; his remains are buried in a crypt in the Cathedral of San Juan Bautista in San Juan
- Juan Ponce de León II, first Puerto Rican acting governor (1579)

20th century

- Juan Bernardo Huyke, second Puerto Rican native to serve as temporary Governor of Puerto Rico; in 1923, he served as interim governor between the administrations of Emmet Montgomery Reily and Horace Mann Towner
- Jesús T. Piñero, first Puerto Rican to be named governor of the Island by a U.S. President (1946–1949)
- Luis Muñoz Marín, first elected governor of Puerto Rico (1949–1965)
- Roberto Sánchez Vilella, second elected governor of Puerto Rico (1965–1969)
- Luis A. Ferré, third elected governor of Puerto Rico (1969–1973); philanthropist who donated Museo de Arte de Ponce to the people of Puerto Rico; industrialist who founded the Puerto Rico Cement Company and Ponce Cement, Inc., and developed Puerto Rico Iron Works into a successful foundry
- Rafael Hernández Colón, fourth elected governor of Puerto Rico (1973–1977 and 1985–1993)
- Carlos Romero Barceló, fifth elected governor of Puerto Rico (1977–1985)
- Pedro Rosselló, sixth elected governor of Puerto Rico (1993–2001)

21st century

- Sila Calderón, seventh elected and first female governor of Puerto Rico (2001–2005)
- Aníbal Acevedo Vilá, eighth elected governor of Puerto Rico (2005–2009)
- Luis Fortuño, ninth elected governor of Puerto Rico (2009–2013)
- Alejandro García Padilla, tenth elected governor of Puerto Rico (2013–2017)
- Ricky Rosselló, 11th elected governor of Puerto Rico (2017–2019)
- Pedro Pierluisi, served as de facto governor of Puerto Rico from August 2 to August 7, 2019 (judicially annulled)
- Wanda Vázquez Garced, 13th governor of Puerto Rico (2019–2021)
- Pedro Pierluisi, the 14th Governor of Puerto Rico (2021–Present)

=== First Ladies of Puerto Rico ===
First Lady or First Gentleman of Puerto Rico, a.k.a. Primera Dama o Primer Caballero de Puerto Rico in Spanish, is the official title given by the government of Puerto Rico to the spouse of the governor of Puerto Rico or the relatives of the governor, should the holder be unmarried. The governor's spouse leads the Office of the First Lady or First Gentleman of Puerto Rico. The position of First Lady or First Gentleman carries no official duty and receives no compensation for their service. They generally oversee the administration of La Fortaleza, the mansion that serves as the governor's residence and office. They also organize events and civic programs, and typically get involved in different charities and social causes.

- Inés Mendoza, First Lady of Puerto Rico (1949–1965); revered teacher and cultural leader
- Jeannette Ramos, First Lady of Puerto Rico (1967–1969)
- Conchita Dapena, First Lady of Puerto Rico (1965–1966)
- Lila Mayoral Wirshing, youngest First Lady of Puerto Rico (1973–1977, 1985–1992)
- Kate de Romero, First Lady of Puerto Rico (1977–1985); Trustee of the Conservation Trust of Puerto Rico
- Irma Margarita "Maga" Neváres, First Lady of Puerto Rico (1993–2001)
- Luisa Gándara, First Lady of Puerto Rico (2005–2009)
- Lucé Vela, First Lady of Puerto Rico (2009–2013)
- Wilma Pastrana, First Lady of Puerto Rico (2013–2017)
- Beatriz Areizaga, First Lady of Puerto Rico (2017–2019)

=== First Gentleman of Puerto Rico ===
- Jorge Díaz Reverón First Gentleman of Puerto Rico (August 7, 2019 – 2021); married to Governor Wanda Vázquez Garced.

== Historians ==
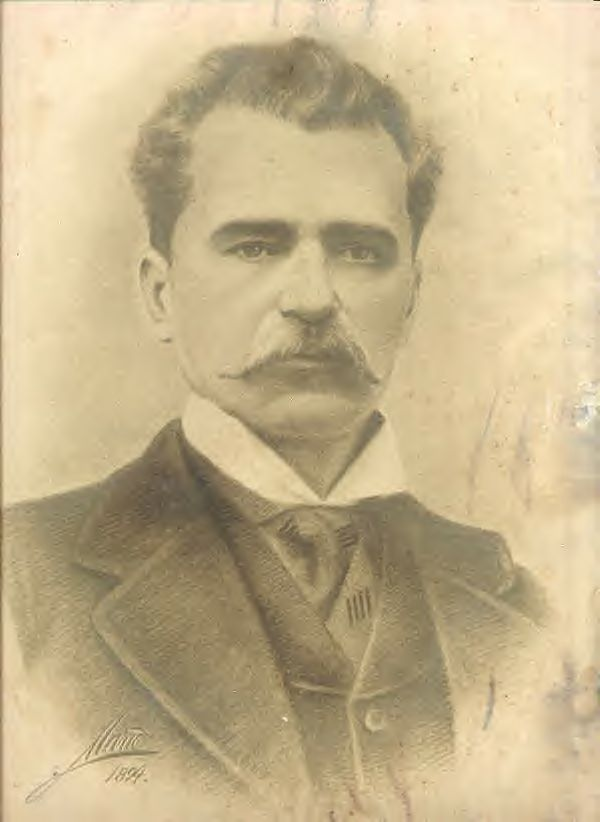
Salvador Brau

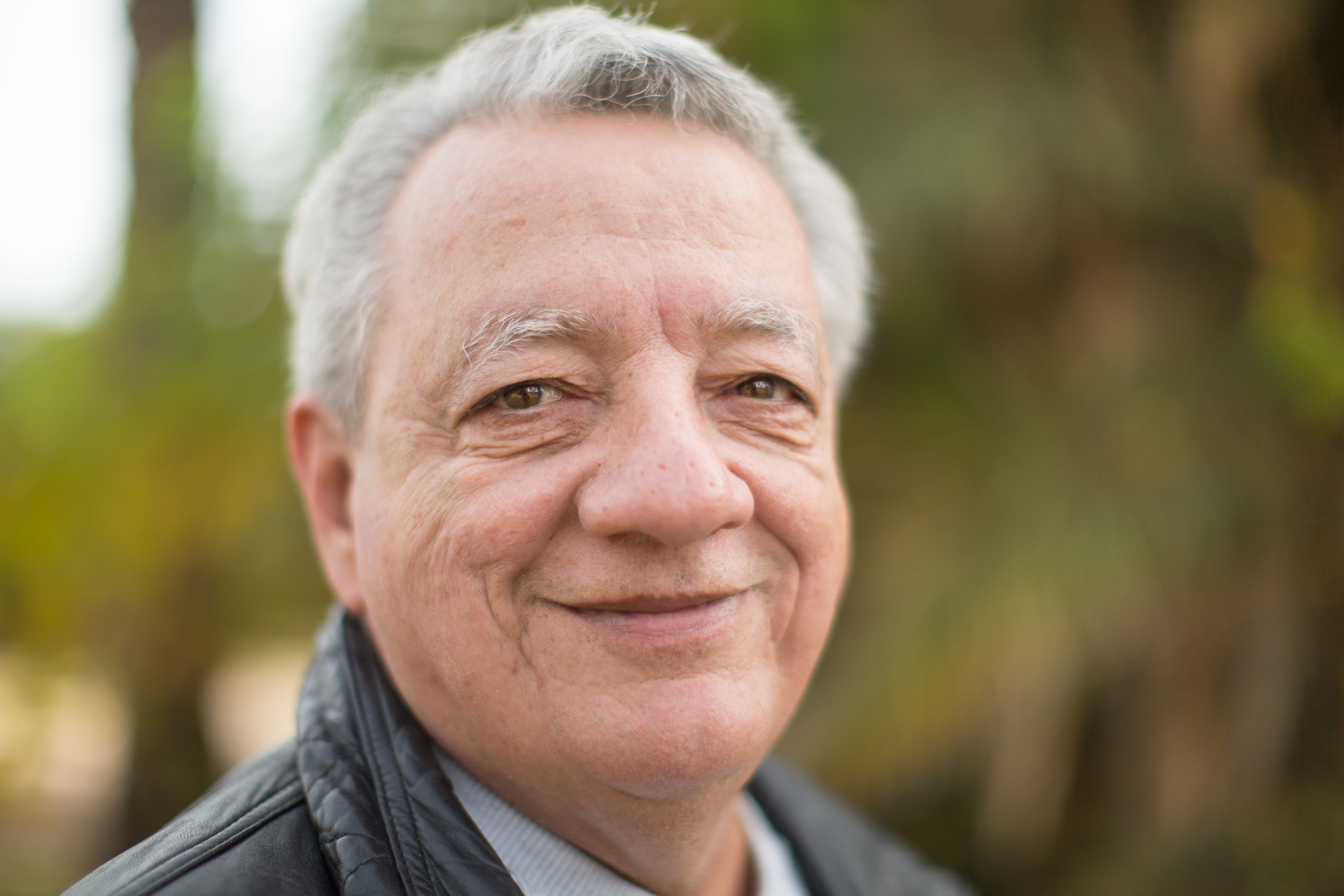
Tony Santiago Rodríguez, a.k.a. Tony "the Marine" Santiago

- Iñigo Abbad y Lasierra, first historian (Spanish) to extensively document Puerto Rico's history, nationality and culture
- Delma S. Arrigoitia, historian, author; first person in the University of Puerto Rico to earn a master's degree in the field of history; in 2010, her book, Puerto Rico Por Encima de Todo: Vida y Obra de Antonio R. Barceló, 1868–1938, was recognized among the best in the category of "research and criticism" and awarded a first place prize by the Ateneo Puertorriqueño
- Pilar Barbosa, University of Puerto Rico professor; author; first modern-day Official Historian of Puerto Rico
- Salvador Brau, historian, first Official Historian of Puerto Rico
- Cayetano Coll y Toste, historian; best known for his classic work Boletín Histórico de Puerto Rico
- Adolfo de Hostos, historian
- Francisco Lluch Mora, known for his legendary book Orígenes y Fundación de Ponce y Otras Noticias Relativas a su Desarrollo Urbano, Demográfico y Cultural (Siglos XVI-XIX)
- Eduardo Neumann Gandía, historian, known for his 19th-century History of Ponce
- Francisco Mariano Quiñones, historian; first Official Historian of Puerto Rico
- Andrés Ramos Mattei, historian
- Tony Santiago, military historian

== Journalists ==
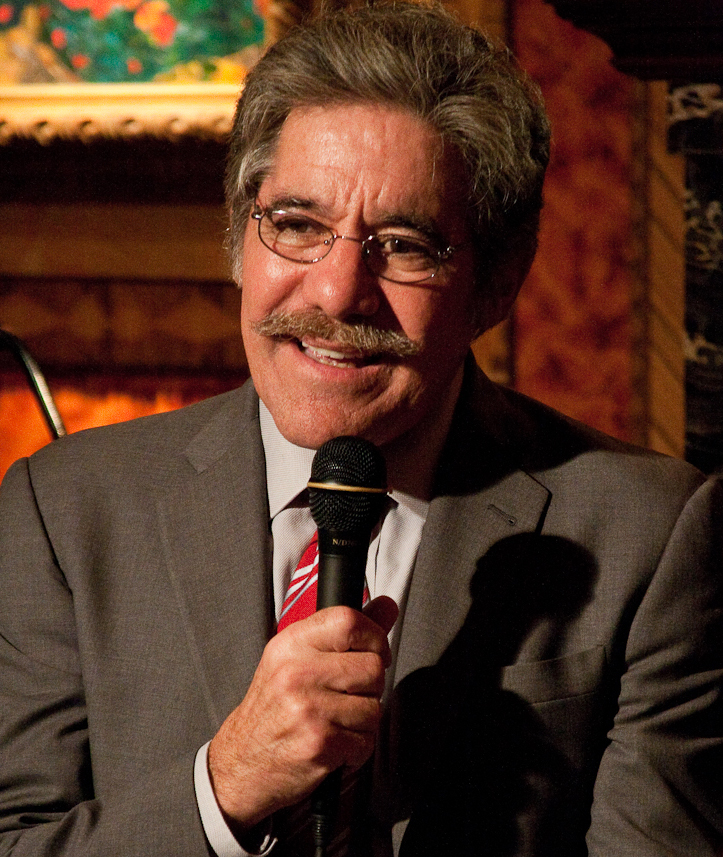
Geraldo Rivera

- José Julián Acosta, journalist and advocate of the abolition of slavery
- José Andino y Amezquita, first Puerto Rican journalist
- César Andreu Iglesias, founding editor of Claridad newspaper; novelist/independence activist
- María Celeste Arrarás, anchor for Al Rojo Vivo
- Lynda Baquero, reporter, WNBC in New York City
- Bárbara Bermudo, journalist; co-host of Univision's Primer Impacto
- Marysol Castro, co-host of ABC's Good Morning America
- Antonio Cortón, late 19th century writer, journalist, literary critic, and editor of newspaper in Barcelona, Spain; wrote Las Antillas and the biography of José de Espronceda, a 19th-century poet
- Christopher Crommett, Atlanta-based Executive Vice President of CNN en Español
- Isabel Cuchí Coll, journalist and author; granddaughter of Cayetano Coll y Toste and niece of José Coll y Cuchí; served as Director of the "Sociedad de Autores Puertorriqueños
- Carmen Dominicci, co-host of Univision's Primer Impacto
- Malín Falú, Spanish language radio and television host
- Manuel Fernández Juncos, journalist and short story writer; lyricist who wrote the lyrics to "La Borinqueña"
- Juan González, New York City investigative journalist
- Aníbal González Irizarry, former newscaster for Telenoticias en acción
- Jackie Guerrido, journalist and meteorologist for Univision's Despierta América
- Kimberly Guilfoyle, Court TV journalist; former First Lady of San Francisco (Puerto Rican mother)
- Carmen Jovet, journalist, first Puerto Rican woman named a news anchor in Puerto Rico
- Michele LaFountain, anchor for the Spanish version of ESPN Sports Center
- Alycia Lane, journalist and news anchor on KYW-TV in Philadelphia
- Lynda López, New York City television news personality; sister of Jennifer López
- Natalie Morales, journalist and news anchor on NBC's The Today Show
- Denisse Oller, Emmy Award-winning New York City television news anchor
- Carlos D. Ramirez, publisher of El Diario La Prensa, New York City's largest Spanish-language newspaper
- Jorge L. Ramos, Emmy Award-winning New York City television news anchor
- Geraldo Rivera, attorney, journalist, writer, reporter and former talk show host; hosts the newsmagazine program Geraldo at Large, and appears regularly on Fox News Channel
- Darlene Rodríguez, New York City television news anchor
- Rubén Sánchez, radio and television journalist
- Edna Schmidt, anchor for Telefutura
- Ray Suárez, Senior Correspondent for The NewsHour with Jim Lehrer
- Guillermo José Torres, journalist and news anchor for WAPA-TV
- Elizabeth Vargas, television journalist; former co-anchor of ABC World News Tonight
- Antonio Vélez Alvarado, journalist; "father of the Puerto Rican flag"
- Jane Vélez-Mitchell, anchor for the HLN news network (Puerto Rican mother)

== Judges, law enforcement and firefighters ==
Judges

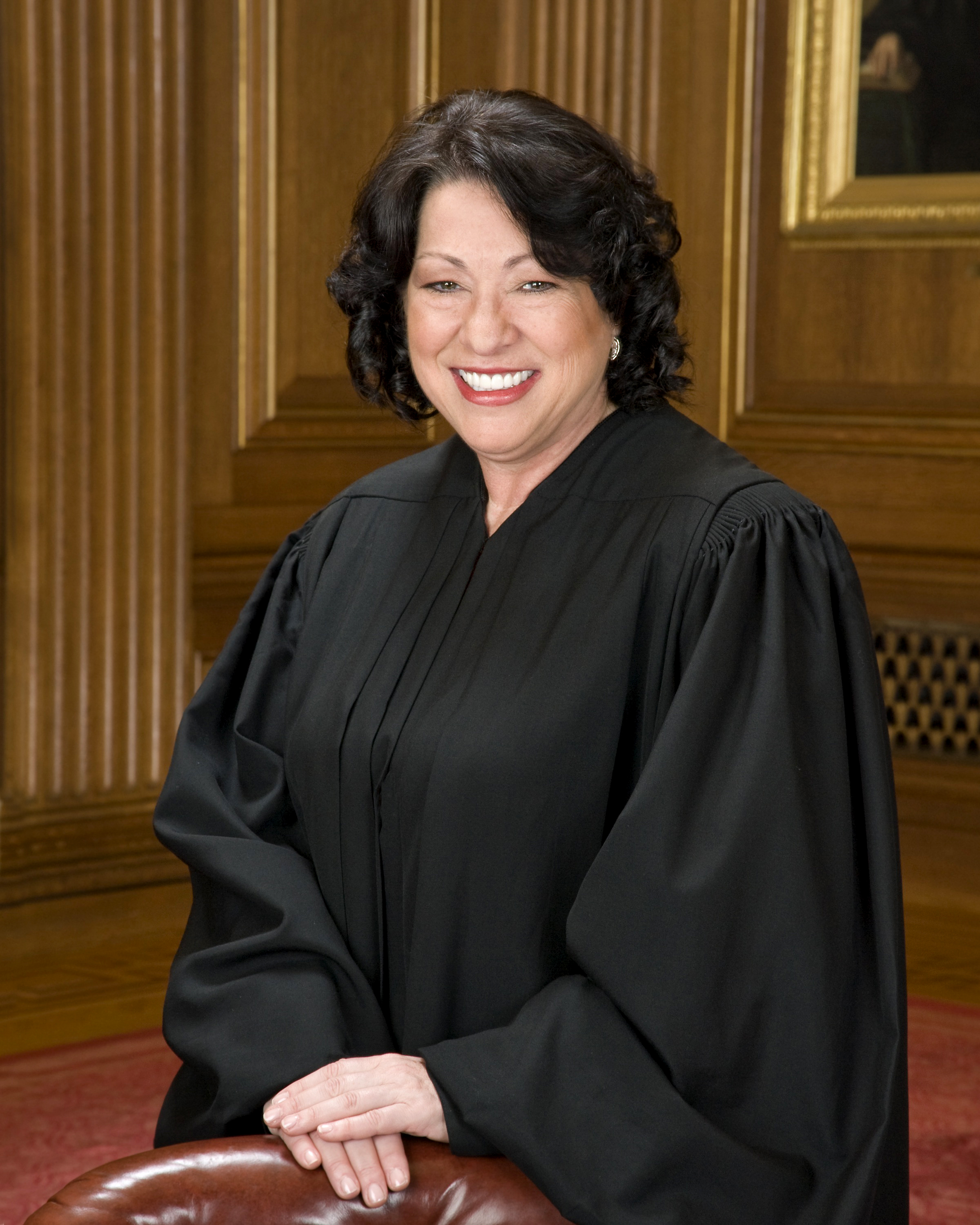
Sonia Sotomayor, Associate Justice of the United States Supreme Court

- Cathy Bissoon, judge for the United States District Court for the Western District of Pennsylvania; first Hispanic female Article III judge in Pennsylvania
- José A. Cabranes, 2nd Circuit Court of Appeals Judge; first Puerto Rican to serve as a federal judge in the continental United States
- Albert Diaz, Judge of the United States Court of Appeals for the Fourth Circuit; first Puerto Rican and first Hispanic Judge to serve the Fourth Circuit Court of Appeals; former Appellate Judge for the Navy-Marine Corps Court of Criminal Appeals
- Angel G. Hermida, Superior Court Judge, Commonwealth of Puerto Rico (1976–1997); visiting professor in Comparative Law at Boston University (1984); Chief Clerk of the Supreme Court of Puerto Rico (1974–1976); Physics professor at the University of Puerto Rico, Mayagüez Campus (1964–1966); author of MIRIAM J. RAMÍREZ DE FERRER Recurrente Vs. JUAN MARI BRAS, which decided that citizens of Puerto Rico have a right to vote in Puerto Rican elections, whether or not they are citizens of the United States
- Federico Hernández Denton, former Chief Justice of the Puerto Rico Supreme Court; Puerto Rico's first Consumer Affairs Secretary
- Erick Kolthoff, Associate Justice of the Supreme Court of Puerto Rico; first Puerto Rican of African descent to be named Associate Justice of the Supreme Court of Puerto Rico
- Victor Marrero, Judge of the United States District Court for the Southern District of New York
- Maite Oronoz Rodriguez, first openly LGBTQ female Chief Justice in United States history, the third woman to preside the Supreme Court of Puerto Rico and the youngest person to do so
- Victor Manuel Pons Núñez, Chief justice of the Supreme Court of Puerto Rico from 1985 until 1992; former Secretary of State of Puerto Rico from 1973 until 1974
- Nitza Quiñones Alejandro, Judge of the United States District Court for the Eastern District of Pennsylvania; first lesbian Latina ever to be nominated by a U.S. president, in this case President Obama, to serve as a federal judge
- Jaime Rios (judge) In 1995, Rios was elected to the State Supreme Court. In 2001 he became associate justice of the Appellate Term of the State Supreme Court, a position he currently holds. He is the only judge from Queens that make up the term. As an appellate judge, Rios reviews all the appeals taken from the courts throughout Brooklyn, Queens and Staten Island.
- Sonia Sotomayor, first Puerto Rican woman to serve as an (2nd Cir.) U.S. Circuit Court of Appeals judge and first Hispanic to be nominated and confirmed as an Associate Justice of the Supreme Court of the United States
- José Trías Monge, former Chief Justice, Attorney General of Puerto Rico, author
- Marilyn Zayas, first Latina and Puerto Rican judge elected to an Ohio State Court of Appeals
- Roberto Feliberti Cintrón, Associate Justice of the Supreme Court of Puerto Rico; former Commissioned Officer U.S. Navy (1985–1989)

Laws in the U.S. inspired by Puerto Ricans

- Briana's Law – Briana Ojeda was an 11-year-old girl who died in the summer of 2010 when a police officer did not perform CPR on her after she suffered from an asthma attack. Briana's Law, which requires that every police officer and member of the State Police, including police officer trainees and state police cadets, receive CPR training prior to employment as well as during employment every two years, was named in her honor.
- Gonzales v. Williams – Isabel González was a Puerto Rican activist who helped pave the way for Puerto Ricans to be given United States citizenship. González challenged the Government of the United States in the groundbreaking case Gonzales v. Williams (192 U.S. 1 (1904)). Her Supreme Court case is the first time that the Court confronted the citizenship status of inhabitants of territories acquired by the United States. González actively pursued the cause of U.S. citizenship for all Puerto Ricans by writing letters published in The New York Times.
- Mendez v. Westminster – Felicitas Gomez Mendez was a pioneer of the American civil rights movement. In 1946, Mendez and her husband led an educational civil rights battle that changed California and set an important legal precedent for ending de jure segregation in the United States. Their landmark desegregation case, known as Mendez v. Westminster, paved the way for meaningful integration, public school reform, and the American civil rights movement.

Law enforcement

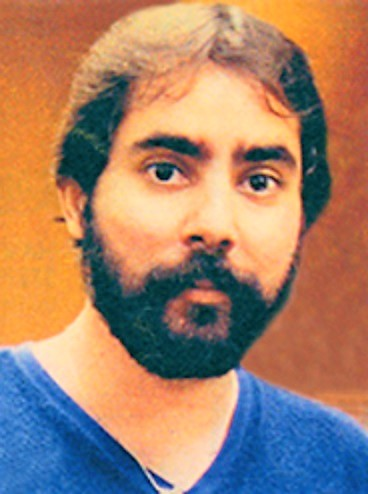
Ariel Rios

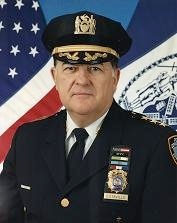
Nick Estavillo

- Ariel Rios On February 5, 1985, the block-long federal building at 1200 Pennsylvania Avenue in Washington, D.C., that used to house the ATF Headquarters was renamed the Ariel Rios Federal Building in his honor.
- Nicholas Estavillo, NYPD Chief of Patrol (Ret.); in 2002, became first Puerto Rican and first Hispanic in the history of the NYPD to reach the three-star rank of Chief of Patrol
- Faith Evans, Hawaiian-Puerto Rican, first woman to be named U.S. Marshal
- Alejandro González Malavé, controversial undercover police officer
- Irma Lozada, New York City transit police; first female police officer to die in the line of duty in New York City
- José Meléndez-Pérez, INS officer who was named in 9/11 Commission Report; denied entry to terrorist in August 2001
- Benito Romano, United States Attorney in New York; first Puerto Rican to hold the United States Attorney's post in New York on an interim basis
- Joe Sánchez, former New York City police officer and author whose books give an insight as to the corruption within the department
- Pedro Toledo, retired FBI senior agent and longest-serving state police superintendent
- Alex Villanueva, Los Angeles County Sheriff

Firefighters

- Raúl Gándara Cartagena, first and longest-serving Commonwealth fire chief in Puerto Rico, 1942–1972
- Carlos M. Rivera, former Fire Commissioner of the City of New York; first Hispanic commissioner in the New York City Fire Department's 127-year history

== Military ==
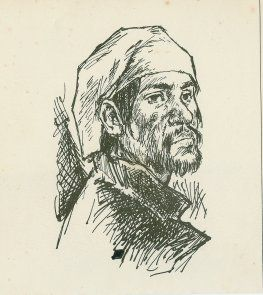
Miguel Enríquez

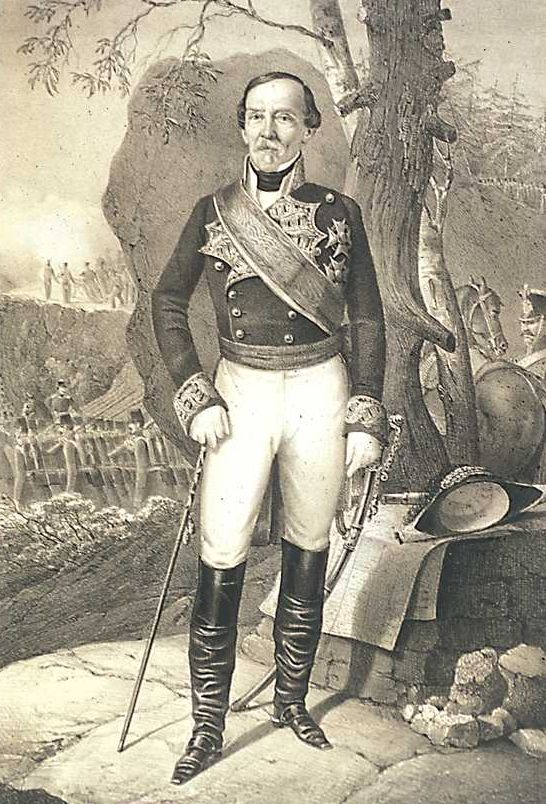
Demetrio O'Daly

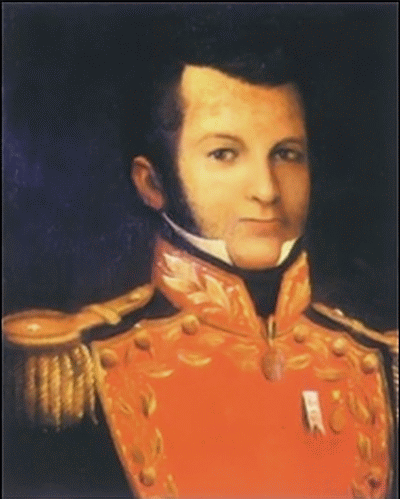
Antonio Valero de Bernabé

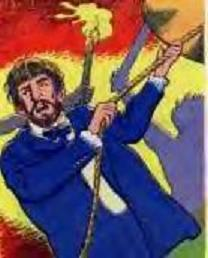
Manuel Rojas

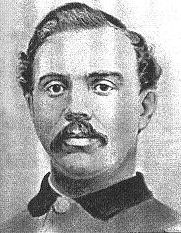
Augusto Rodríguez

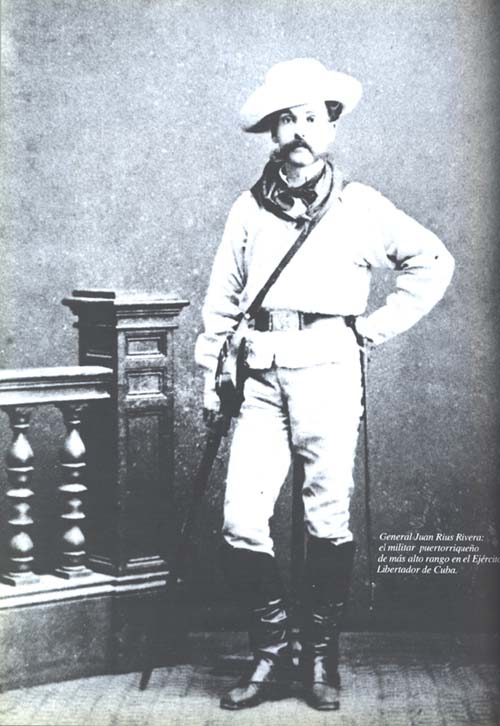
Juan Ríus Rivera

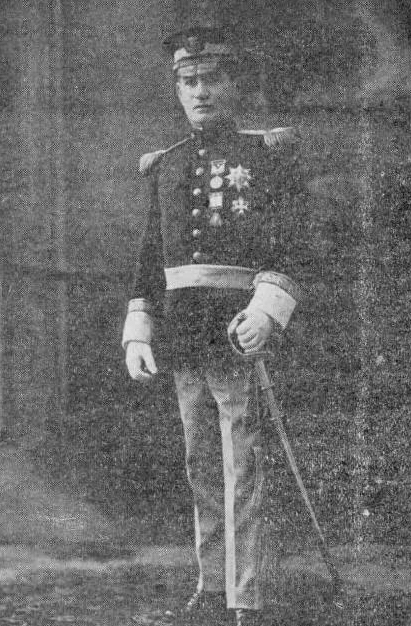
José Semidei Rodríguez

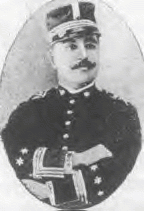
Ángel Rivero Méndez

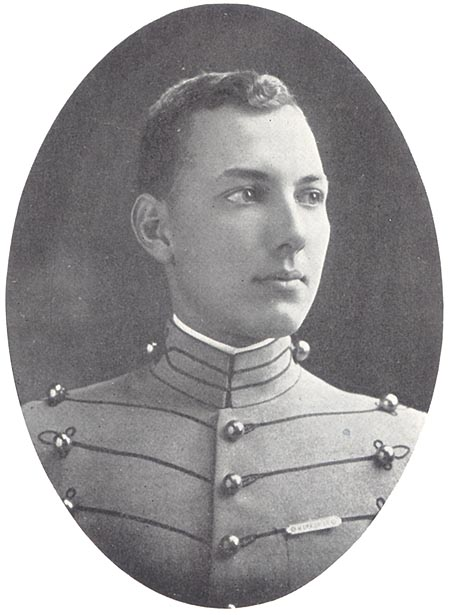
Luis R. Esteves

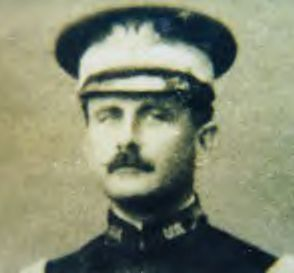
Teófilo Marxuach

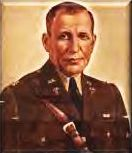
Fernando E. Rodríguez Vargas

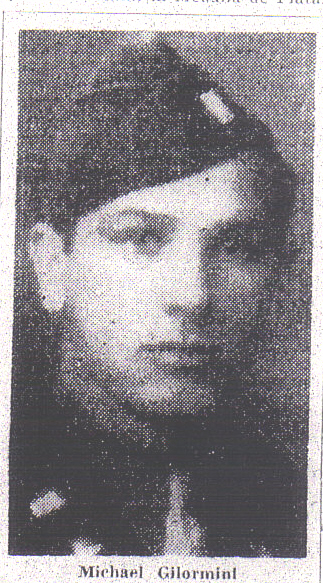
Mihiel Gilormini

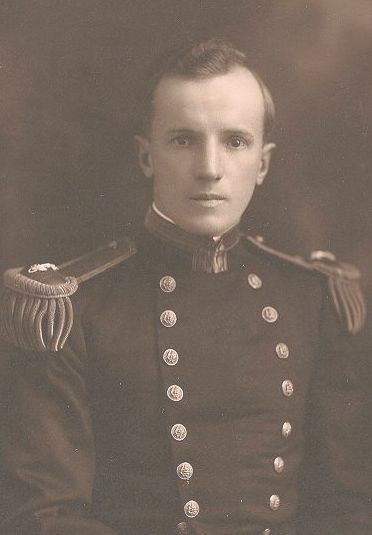
Frederick Lois Riefkohl

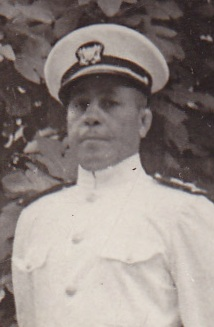
Joseph B. Aviles Sr.

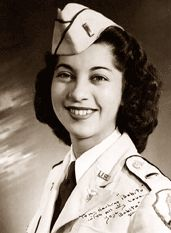
Carmen Dumler

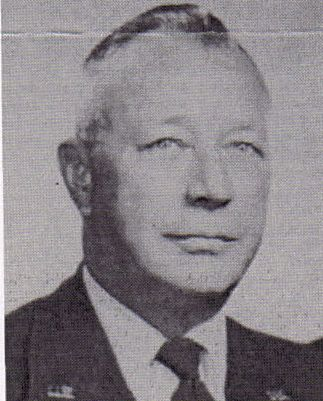
Virgil R. Miller

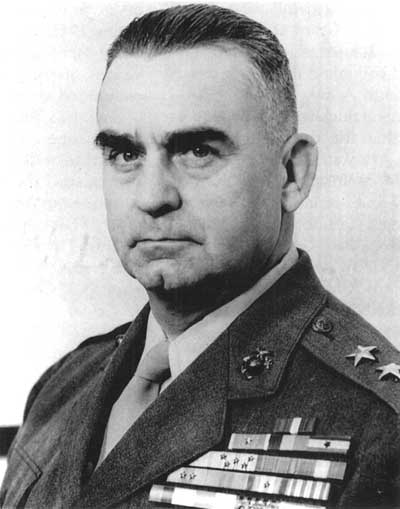
Pedro del Valle

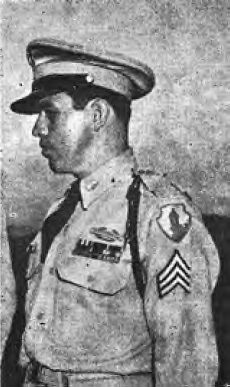
Agustin Ramos Calero

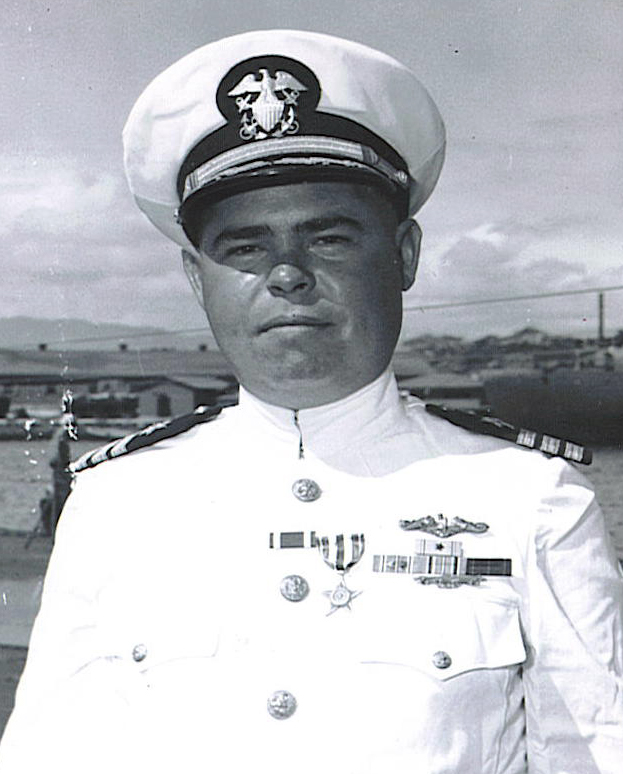
Marion Frederic Ramírez de Arellano

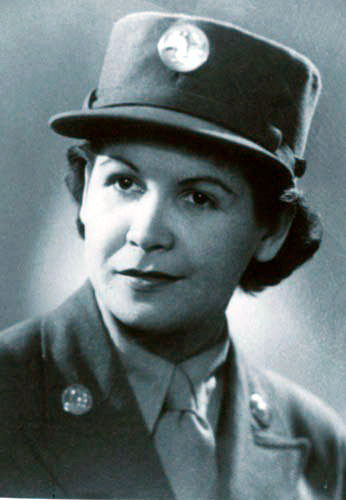
Carmen Contreras-Bozak

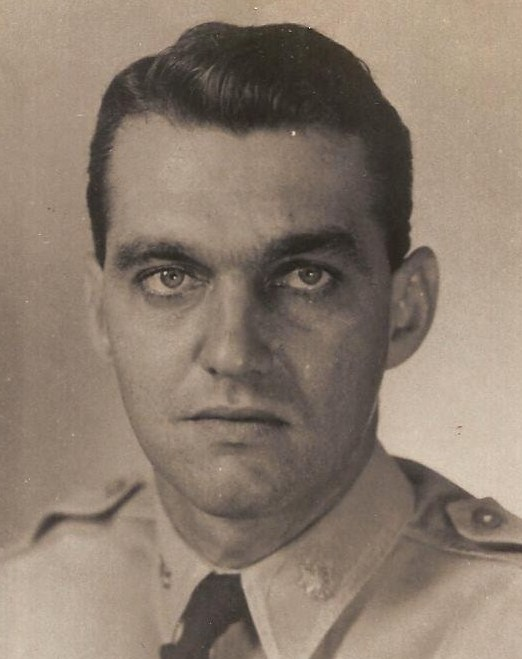
José Antonio Muñiz

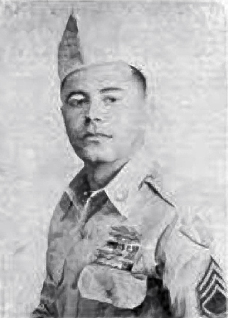
Modesto Cartagena

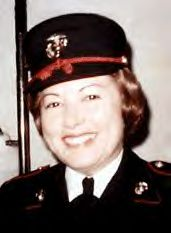
Rose Franco

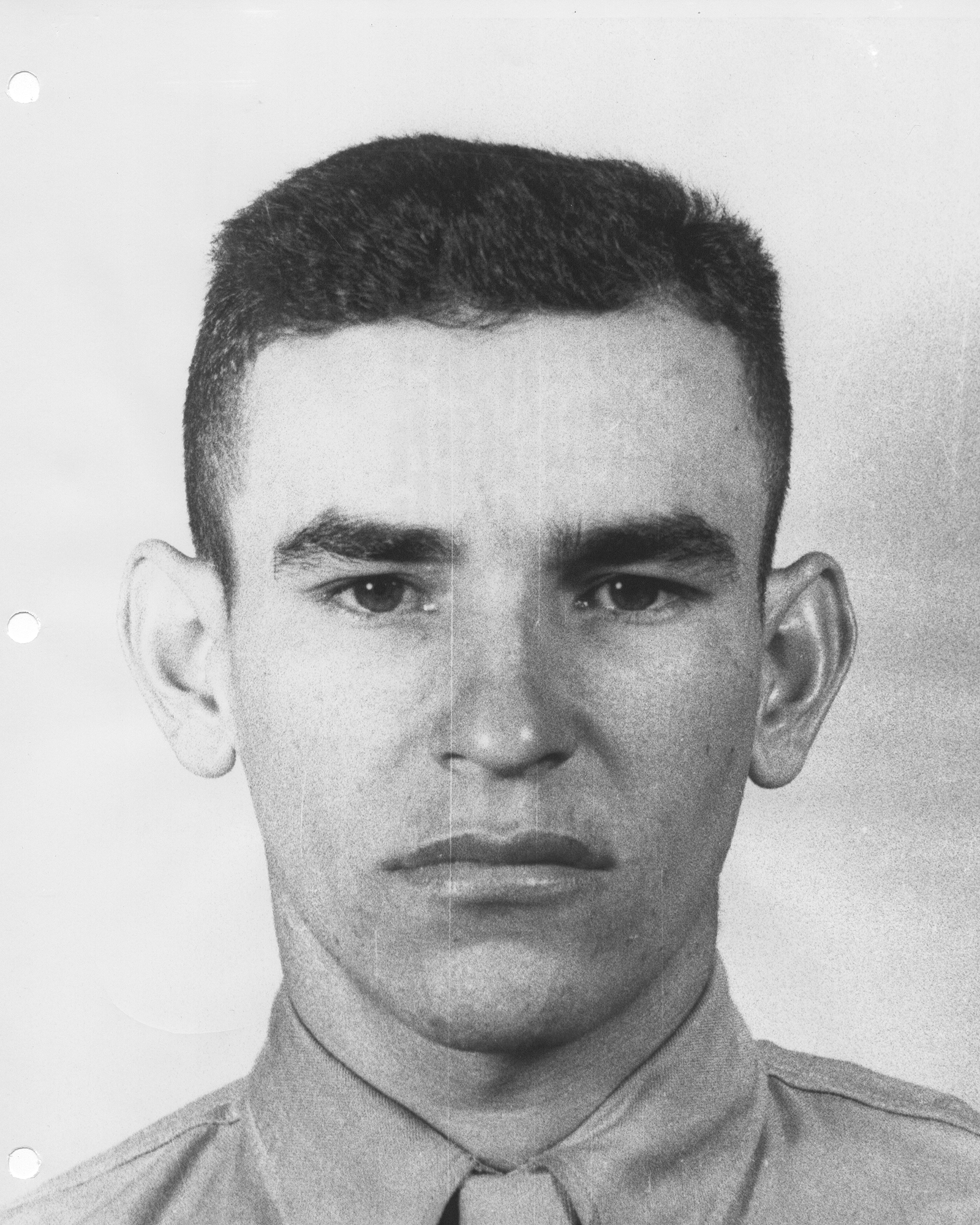
Fernando Luis García

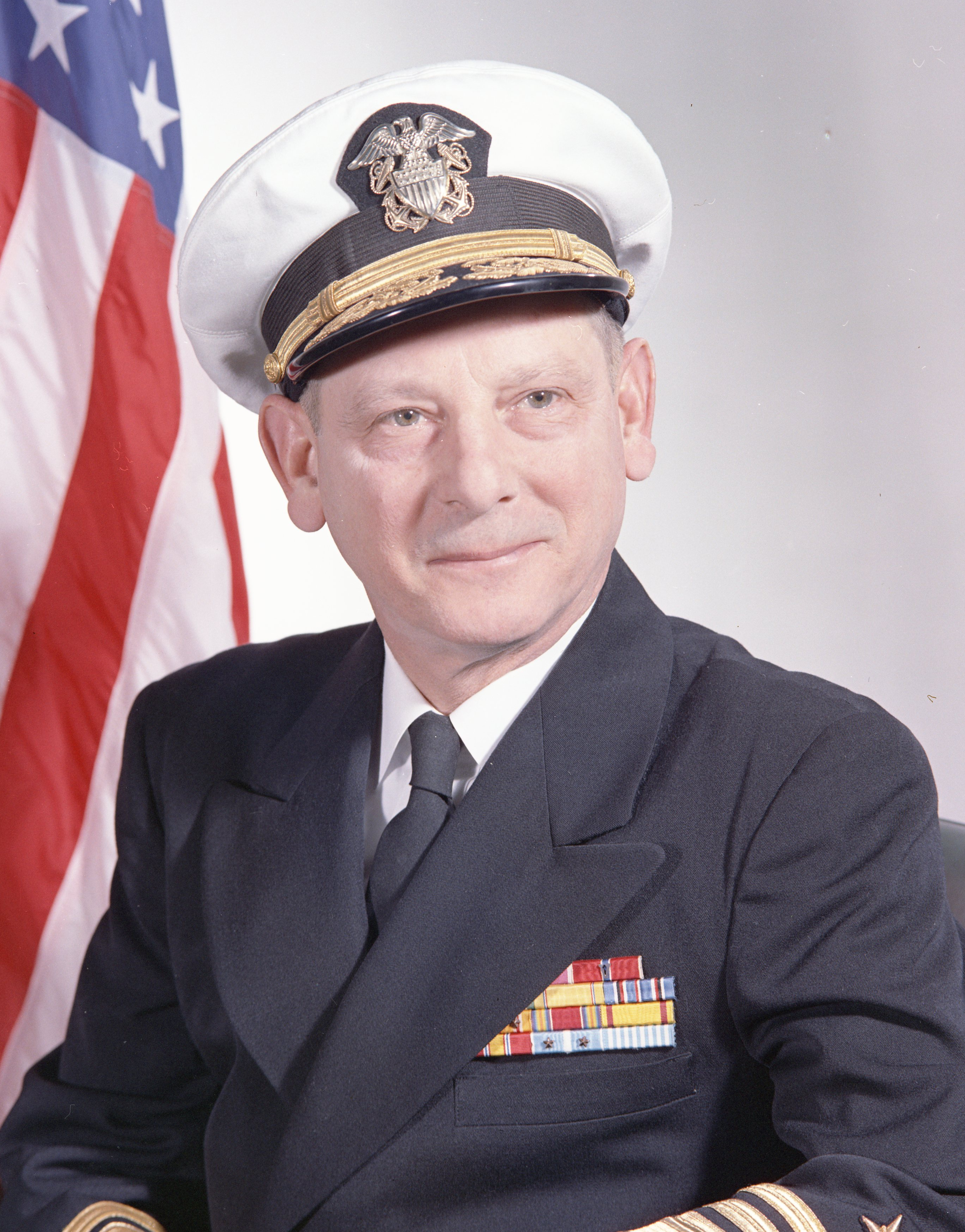
Horacio Rivero Jr.

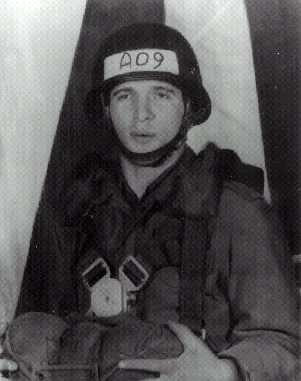
Carlos James Lozada

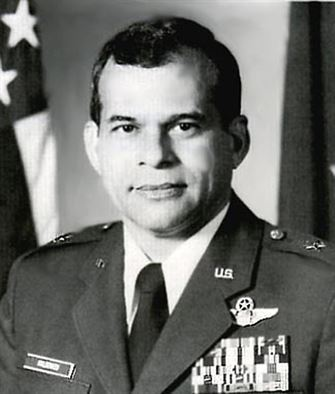
Antonio Maldonado

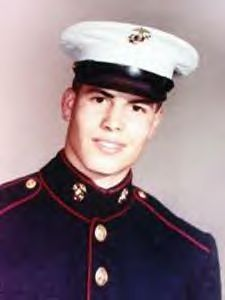
Angel Mendez

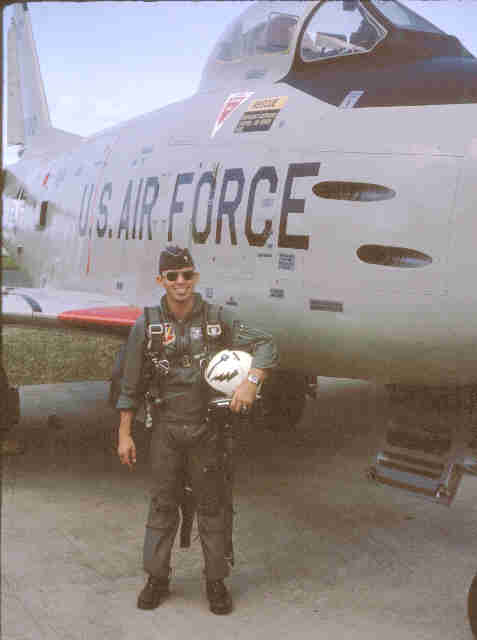
Héctor Andrés Negroni

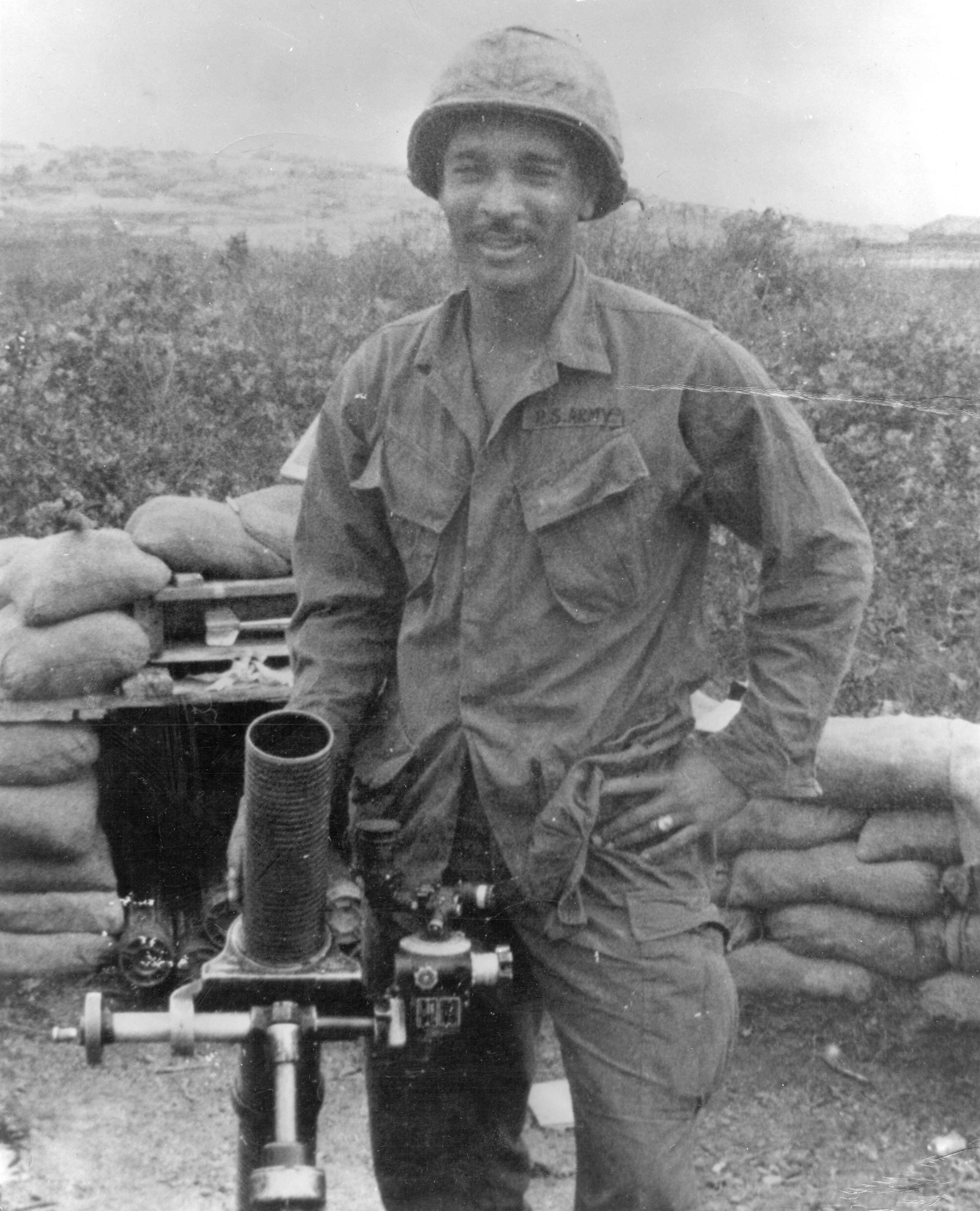
Héctor Santiago-Colón

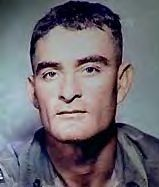
Jorge Otero Barreto

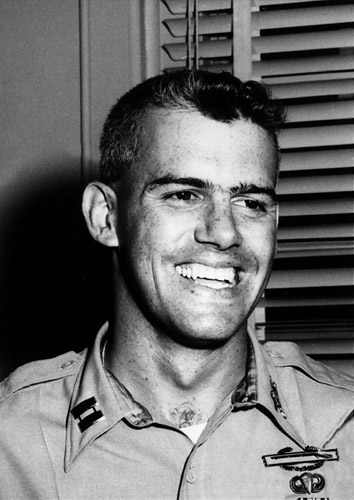
Humbert Roque "Rocky" Versace

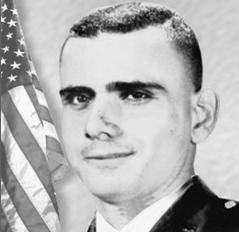
Eurípides Rubio

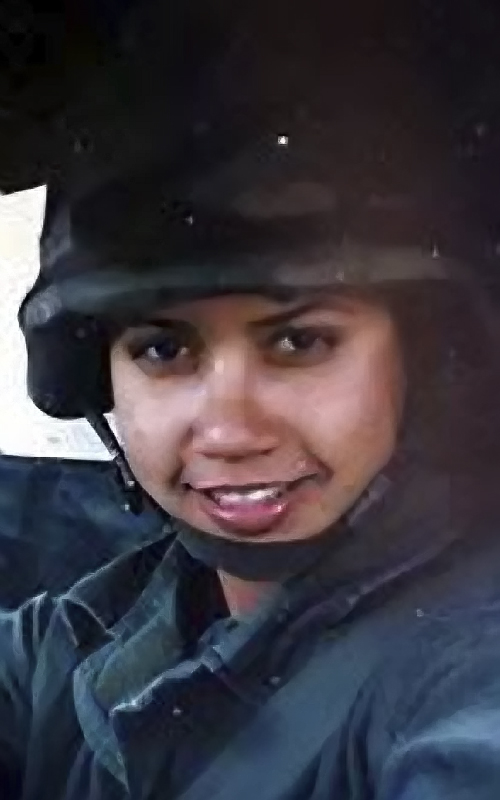
Lizbeth Robles

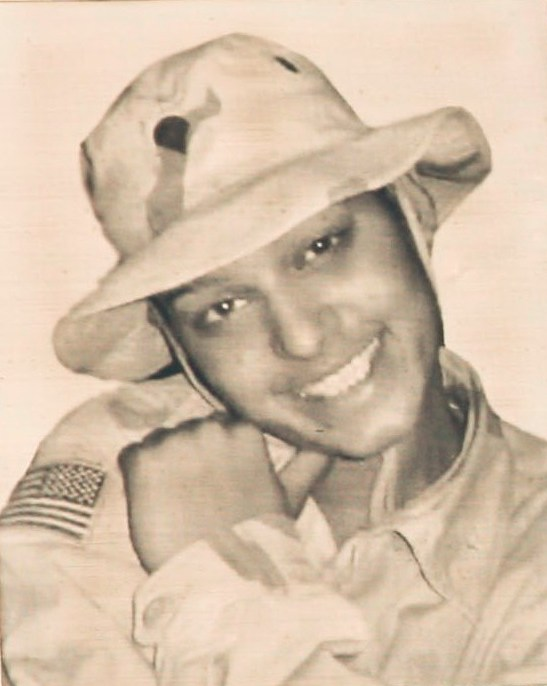
Frances M. Vega

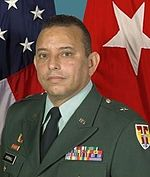
Rafael O'Ferrall

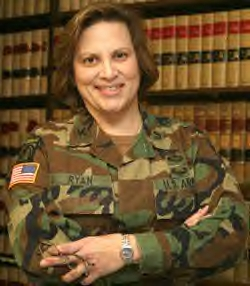
Maritza Sáenz Ryan

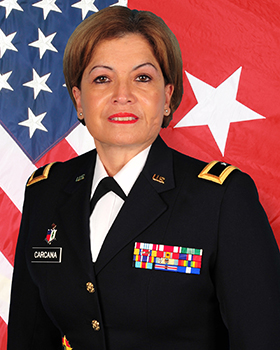
Brigadier General Marta Carcana

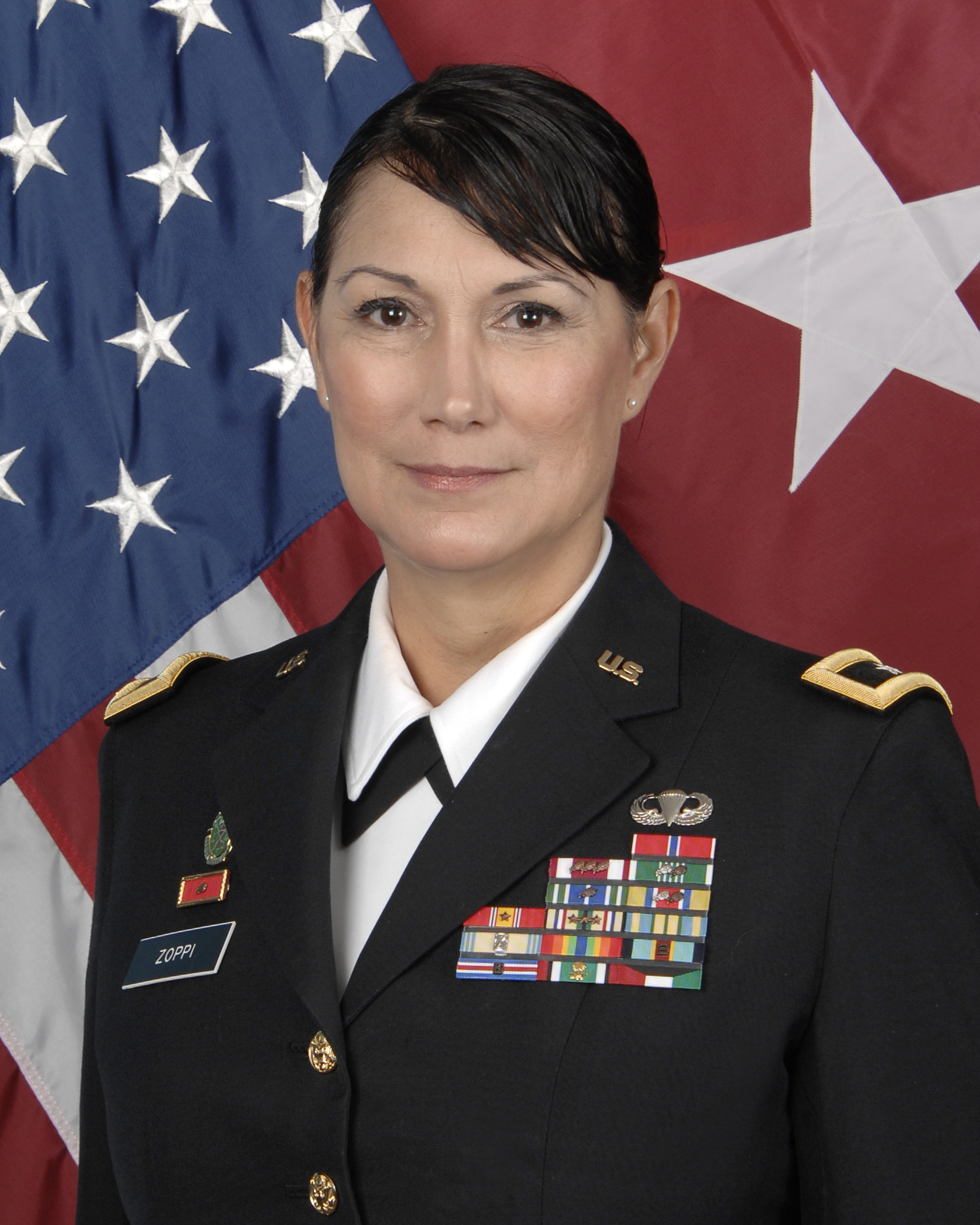
Brigadier General Irene M. Zoppi

16th century

- Agüeybaná II, Cacique of "Borikén" (Puerto Rico); led the Taínos in the fight against Juan Ponce de León and the conquistadores in the Taíno Rebellion of 1511

17th century

- Juan de Amézqueta, Captain, Puerto Rican Militia; defeated Captain Balduino Enrico (Boudewijn Hendricksz), who in 1625 was ordered by the Dutch to capture Puerto Rico

18th century

- Rafael Conti, Colonel, Spanish Army; in 1790, captured 11 enemy ships involved in smuggling stolen goods. In 1797, he helped defeat Sir Ralph Abercromby and defend Puerto Rico from a British invasion in his hometown, Aguadilla. In 1809, he organized a military expedition fight with the aim of returning Hispaniola, which now comprise the nations of the Dominican Republic and Haiti, back to Spanish rule.
- Antonio de los Reyes Correa, Captain, Spanish Army; Puerto Rican hero who defended the town Arecibo in 1702 from an invasion by defeating the British; was awarded La Medalla de Oro de la Real Efigie (The Gold Medal of the Royal Image), by King Philip V of Spain and given the title "Captain of Infantry"
- José and Francisco Díaz, Sergeants, Puerto Rican militia; cousins in the Toa Baja Militia who helped defeat Sir Ralph Abercromby and defend Puerto Rico from a British invasion in 1797
- Miguel Henríquez, Captain, Spanish Navy; in 1713, defeated the British in Vieques and was awarded the La Medalla de Oro de la Real Efigie (The Gold Medal of the Royal Effigy)

19th century

- Ramón Acha Caamaño, Brigadier General, Spanish Army; defended the city of San Juan against the U.S. attack of Puerto Rico during the Spanish–American War; awarded the Cruz de la Orden de Merito Naval 1ra clase (The Cross of the Order of the Naval Merit 1st class) by the Spanish government for his role in the rescue of the cargo of the Spanish transoceanic steamer SS Antonio López
- Francisco Hernáiz, Rear admiral migrated in Venezuela
- Juan Alonso Zayas, 2nd Lieutenant, Spanish Army; commander of the 2nd Expeditionary Battalion of the Spanish Army stationed in Baler which fought in the Siege of Baler in the Philippines
- Francisco Gonzalo Marín, Lieutenant, Cuban Liberation Army; considered by many as the designer of the Puerto Rican flag; a poet and journalist; fought alongside José Martí for Cuba's independence
- Demetrio O'Daly, first Puerto Rican to reach the rank of Field Marshal in the Spanish Army; first Puerto Rican to be awarded the Cruz Laureada de San Fernando (Laureate Cross of Saint Ferdinand – Spain's version of the Medal of Honor); elected as delegate to the Spanish Courts in representation of Puerto Rico
- Luis Padial, Brigadier General, Spanish Army; in 1863, his battalion was deployed with the intention of "squashing" a pro-independence rebellion in the Dominican Republic, in which he was wounded; played an essential role in the abolishment of slavery in Puerto Rico
- Ramón Power y Giralt, Captain, Spanish Navy; distinguished naval officer who from 1808 to 1809 led the defense of the Spanish Colony of Santo Domingo (Dominican Republic) against an invasion from Napoleon's French forces by enforcing a blockade in support of the Spanish ground troops
- Ángel Rivero Méndez, Captain, Spanish Army; fired the first shot against the United States in the Spanish–American War in Puerto Rico; later invented Kola Champagne, a soft drink
- Juan Ríus Rivera, Commander-in-Chief of the Cuban Liberation Army; fought in El Grito de Lares under the command of Mathias Brugman; fought in Cuba's Ten Years' War (1868–1878) against Spain under the command of General Máximo Gómez and became the General of the Cuban Liberation Army of the West upon the death of General Antonio Maceo Grajales
- Augusto Rodríguez, Lieutenant, United States Union Army; member of the 15th Connecticut Regiment (a.k.a. Lyon Regiment); served in the defenses of Washington, D.C.; led his men in the Battles of Fredericksburg and Wyse Fork in the American Civil War
- Manuel Rojas, Commander in Chief of the Puerto Rican Liberation Army; on September 28, 1868, he led 800 men and women in a revolt against Spanish rule and took the town of Lares in the Grito de Lares
- José Semidei Rodríguez, Brigadier General, Cuban Liberation Army; fought in Cuba's War of Independence (1895–1898); after Cuba gained its independence he continued to serve there as a diplomat
- Antonio Valero de Bernabé, Brigadier General in the Latin American wars of independence; fought against the forces of Napoleon Bonaparte at the Siege of Saragossa; joined the Mexican Revolutionary Army headed by Agustín de Iturbide and was named Chief of Staff; successfully fought for Mexico's independence from Spain; fought alongside Simón Bolívar and helped liberate South America from Spanish Colonial rule; known as the "Puerto Rican Liberator"

20th century

- Ricardo Aponte, Brigadier General, U.S. Air Force; fighter pilot in F-111s, politico-military affairs, former director of the Innovation and Experimentation Directorate, United States Southern Command; first Puerto Rican to hold this position
- Félix Arenas Gaspar, Captain, Spanish Army; posthumously awarded the Cruz Laureada de San Fernando (Laureate Cross of Saint Ferdinand – Spain's version of the Medal of Honor) for his actions in the Rif War
- Joseph (José) B. Aviles Sr., CWO2, U.S. Coast Guard; on September 28, 1925, became the first Hispanic Chief Petty Officer in the United States Coast Guard; during World War II received a wartime promotion to Chief Warrant Officer, becoming the first Hispanic to reach that level as well
- Rafael Celestino Benítez, Rear Admiral, U.S. Navy; a highly decorated submarine commander who led the rescue effort of the crew members of the USS Cochino, which was involved in the first American undersea spy mission of the Cold War
- Carlos Betances Ramírez, Colonel, U.S. Army; first Puerto Rican to command a battalion in the Korean War; in 1952, he assumed the command of the 2nd Battalion, 65th Infantry Regiment
- José M. Cabanillas, Rear Admiral, U.S. Navy; in World War II he was Executive Officer of the USS Texas (BB-35) and participated in the invasions of Africa and Normandy (D-Day)
- Richard Carmona, Vice Admiral, Public Health Service Commissioned Corps; served as the 17th Surgeon General of the United States under President George W. Bush
- Modesto Cartagena, Sergeant First Class, U.S. Army; the most decorated Hispanic soldier in history; distinguished himself in combat during the Korean War as a member of Puerto Rico's 65th Infantry and is being considered for the Medal of Honor
- Carlos Fernando Chardón, Major General, Puerto Rico National Guard; Secretary of State of Puerto Rico 1969–73; Puerto Rico Adjutant General 1973–75
- Félix Conde Falcón, Staff Sergeant, U.S. Army; received the Medal of Honor posthumously on March 18, 2014, for his courageous actions while serving as an acting Platoon Leader in Company D, 1st Battalion, 505th Infantry Regiment, 3d Brigade, 82d Airborne Division during combat operations against an armed enemy in Ap Tan Hoa, Republic of Vietnam on April 4, 1969
- Carmen Contreras-Bozak, Tech4, U.S. Women's Army Corps; first Hispanic to serve in the U.S. Women's Army Corps; served as an interpreter and in numerous administrative positions during World War II
- Virgilio N. Cordero Jr., Brigadier General, U.S. Army; a Battalion Commander of the 31st Infantry Regiment who documented his experiences as a prisoner of war and his participation in the infamous Bataan Death March of World War II.
- Juan César Cordero Dávila, Major General, U.S. Army; commanding officer of the 65th Infantry Regiment during the Korean War, thus becoming one of the highest ranking ethnic officers in the Army
- Encarnación Correa, Sergeant, U.S. Army; the person who fired the first warning shots in World War I on behalf of the United States against a ship flying the colors of the Central Powers, when on March 21, 1915, under the orders of then-Lieutenant Teófilo Marxuach, he manned a machine gun and opened fire on the Odenwald, an armed German supply ship trying to force its way out of the San Juan Bay
- Ruben A. Cubero, Brigadier General U.S. Air Force; of Puerto Rican descent; highly decorated member of the United States Air Force; in 1991 became the first Hispanic graduate of the United States Air Force Academy to be named Dean of the Faculty of the Academy
- Pedro del Valle, Lieutenant General, U.S. Marine Corps; first Hispanic three-star Marine general; his military career included service in World War I, Haiti and Nicaragua during the so-called Banana Wars of the 1920s, and in the seizure of Guadalcanal and later as Commanding General of the U.S. 1st Marine Division during World War II played an instrumental role in the defeat of the Japanese forces in Okinawa
- Carmelo Delgado Delgado, Lieutenant, Abraham Lincoln International Brigade; first Puerto Rican and one of the first U.S. citizens to fight and to die in the Spanish Civil War against General Francisco Franco and the Spanish Nationalists
- Alberto Díaz Jr., Rear Admiral, U.S. Navy; first Hispanic to become the director of the San Diego Naval Medical District
- Luis R. Esteves, major general, U.S. Army; in 1915, became the first Puerto Rican and therefore the first Hispanic to graduate from the United States Military Academy; organized the Puerto Rican National Guard
- Salvador E. Felices, major general, U.S. Air Force; first Puerto Rican general in the U.S. Air Force; in 1953, he flew in 19 combat missions over North Korea during the Korean War; in 1957, he participated in a historic project that was given to Fifteenth Air Force by the Strategic Air Command headquarters known as "Operation Power Flite", the first around the world non-stop flight by all-jet aircraft
- Michelle Fraley (née Hernández), Colonel, U.S. Army; became in 1984 the first Puerto Rican woman to graduate from West Point Military Academy; former chief of staff of the Army Network Enterprise Technology Command
- Rose Franco, CWO3, U.S. Marine Corps; first female Hispanic Chief Warrant Officer in the Marine Corps; in 1965 was named Administrative Assistant to the Secretary of the Navy, Paul Henry Nitze by the administration of President Lyndon B. Johnson
- Edmund Ernest García, Rear Admiral, U.S. Navy; during World War II he was commander of the destroyer USS Sloat (DE-245) and saw action in the invasions of Africa, Sicily, and France
- Fernando Luis García, Private First Class, U.S. Marine Corps; first Puerto Rican awarded the Medal of Honor; posthumously awarded the medal for his actions against enemy aggressor forces in the Korean War on September 5, 1952.
- Linda Garcia Cubero, Captain, U.S. Air Force; of Mexican-Puerto Rican heritage; in 1980 became the first female Hispanic graduate of any of the U.S. military academies when she graduated from the United States Air Force Academy
- Carmen García Rosado, Private First Class, U.S. Women's Army Corps; was among the first 200 Puerto Rican women to be recruited into the WAC's during World War II; author of Las WACS-Participacion de la Mujer Boricua en la Segunda Guerra Mundial (The WACs – The participation of the Puerto Rican women in the Second World War), the first book which documents the experiences of the first 200 Puerto Rican women to participate in said conflict as members of the armed forces of the United States
- Mihiel Gilormini, Brigadier General, U.S. Air Force; World War II hero, recipient of 5 Distinguished Flying Crosses; together with Brig. General Alberto A. Nido and Lt. Col. Jose Antonio Muñiz, founded the Puerto Rico Air National Guard; previously flew for the Royal Canadian Air Force (1941) and the Royal Air Force (1941–1942)
- Manuel Goded Llopis, General, Spanish Army; a Puerto Rican in the Spanish Army; one of the first generales to join General Francisco Franco in the revolt against the Spanish Republican government (also known as Spanish loyalists) in the Spanish Civil War; previously distinguished himself in the Battle of Alhucemas of the Rif War
- César Luis González, First Lieutenant, U.S. Army Air Force; first Puerto Rican pilot in the United States Army Air Force; first Puerto Rican pilot to die in World War II.
- Diego E. Hernández, Vice Admiral, U.S. Navy; first Hispanic to be named Vice Commander, North American Aerospace Defense Command; flew two combat tours in Vietnam during the Vietnam War; in 1980, took command of the aircraft carrier USS John F. Kennedy (CV-67)
- Haydee Javier Kimmich, Captain, U.S. Navy; highest ranking Hispanic female in the Navy; Chief of Orthopedics at the Navy Medical Center in Bethesda and she reorganized Reservist Department of the medical center during Operations Desert Shield and Desert Storm
- Orlando Llenza, Major General, U.S. Air Force; second Puerto Rican to reach the rank of Major General (two-star General) in the United States Air Force; Adjutant General of the Puerto Rico National Guard
- Carlos Lozada, Private First Class, U.S. Army; posthumously awarded the Medal of Honor for his actions on November 20, 1967, at Dak To in the Republic of Vietnam
- Carmen Lozano Dumler, 2nd Lieutenant, U.S. Women's Army Corps; one of the first Puerto Rican women Army officers; in 1944, she was sworn in as a 2nd Lieutenant and assigned to the 161st General Hospital in San Juan
- Antonio Maldonado, Brigadier General, U.S. Air Force; in 1965, became the youngest person to pilot a B-52 aircraft; his active participation in the Vietnam War included 183 air combat missions
- Joseph (José) R. Martínez, Private First Class, U.S. Army; destroyed a German Infantry unit and tank in Tuniz by providing heavy artillery fire, saving his platoon from being attacked in the process; received the Distinguished Service Cross from General George S. Patton, becoming the first Puerto Rican recipient of said military decoration
- Lester Martínez López, MPH, Major General, U.S. Army; first Hispanic to head the Army Medical and Research Command
- Gilberto José Marxuach, Colonel, U.S. Army
- Teófilo Marxuach, Lieutenant Colonel, U.S. Army; fired a hostile shot from a cannon located at the Santa Rosa battery of El Morro fort, in what is considered to be the first shot of World War I fired by the regular armed forces of the United States against any ship flying the colors of the Central Powers, forcing the Odenwald to stop and to return to port where its supplies were confiscated
- George E. Mayer, Rear Admiral, U.S. Navy; first Hispanic Commander of the Naval Safety Center; led an international naval exercise known as Baltic Operations (BALTOPS) 2003 from his flagship, the USS Vella Gulf (CG-72); this was the first time in the 31-year history of BALTOPS that the exercise included combined ground troops from Russia, Poland, Denmark and the United States
- Angel Mendez, Sergeant, U.S. Marine Corps; of Puerto Rican descent; was awarded the Navy Cross in Vietnam and is being considered for the Medal of Honor; saved the life of his lieutenant, Ronald D. Castille, who went on to become the Chief Justice of the Supreme Court of Pennsylvania
- Enrique Méndez Jr., Major General, U.S. Army; first Puerto Rican to assume the positions of Army Deputy Surgeon General, Commander of the Walter Reed Army Medical Center and Assistant Secretary of Defense for Health Affairs
- Virgil R. Miller, Colonel, U.S. Army; Regimental Commander of the 442d Regimental Combat Team (RCT), a unit which was composed of "Nisei" (second generation Americans of Japanese descent), during World War II; led the 442nd in its rescue of the Lost Texas Battalion of the 36th Infantry Division, in the forests of the Vosges Mountains in northeastern France
- José Antonio Muñiz Lieutenant Colonel, U.S. Air Force; together with then-Colonels Alberto A. Nido and Mihiel Gilormini, founded the Puerto Rico Air National Guard; in 1963, the Air National Guard Base, at the San Juan International airport in Puerto Rico, was renamed "Muñiz Air National Guard Base" in his honor
- William A. Navas Jr., Major General, U.S. Army; first Puerto Rican named Assistant Secretary of the Navy; a veteran of the Vietnam War; nominated in 2001 by President George W. Bush to serve as the Assistant Secretary of the Navy (Manpower and Reserve Affairs)
- Juan E. Negrón, Master Sergeant, U.S. Army; received the Medal of Honor posthumously on March 18, 2014, for courageous actions while serving as a member of Company L, 65th Infantry Regiment, 3d Infantry Division during combat operations against an armed enemy in Kalma-Eri, Korea, on April 28, 1951
- Héctor Andrés Negroni, Colonel, U.S. Air Force; first Puerto Rican graduate of the United States Air Force Academy; a veteran of the Vietnam War; was awarded the Aeronautical Merit Cross, Spai'ns highest Air Force peacetime award for his contributions to the successful implementation of the United States-Spain Treaty of Friendship and Cooperation
- Alberto A. Nido, Brigadier General, U.S. Air Force; a World War II war hero who together with Lt. Col. Jose Antonio Muñiz, co-founded the Puerto Rico Air National Guard and served as its commander for many years; served in the Royal Canadian Air Force, the British Royal Air Force and in the United States Army Air Forces during World War II
- Jorge Otero Barreto, Sergeant First Class, U.S. Army; with 38 decorations, which includes 2 Silver Star Medals, 5 Bronze Star Medals with Valor, 4 Army Commendation medals, 5 Purple Heart Medals and 5 Air Medals, has been called the most decorated Puerto Rican soldier of the Vietnam War.
- Dolores Piñero, U.S. Army Medical Corps; despite the fact that she was not an active member of the military, she was the first Puerto Rican woman doctor to serve in the Army under contract during World War I; at first she was turned down, but after writing a letter to the Army Surgeon General in Washington, D.C. she was ordered to report to Camp Las Casas in Santurce, Puerto Rico; in October 1918, she signed her contract with the Army.
- José M. Portela, Brigadier General U.S. Air Force; served in the position of Assistant Adjutant General for Air while also serving as commander of the Puerto Rico Air National Guard; in 1972, became the youngest C-141 Starlifter aircraft commander and captain at age 22; the only reservist ever to serve as director of mobility forces for Bosnia
- Marion Frederic Ramírez de Arellano, Captain, U.S. Navy; first Hispanic submarine commander; awarded two Silver Stars and a Bronze Star for his actions against the Japanese Imperial Navy during World War II
- Antonio J. Ramos, Brigadier General, U.S. Air Force; first Hispanic to serve as commander, Air Force Security Assistance Center, Air Force Materiel Command, and dual-hatted as Assistant to the Commander for International Affairs, Headquarters Air Force Materiel Command
- Agustín Ramos Calero, Sergeant First Class, U.S. Army; with 22 military decorations, was the most decorated soldier in all of the United States during World War II
- Fernando L. Ribas-Dominicci, Major, U.S. Air Force; one of the pilots who participated in the Libyan air raid as member of the 48th Tactical Fighter Wing; his F-111F was shot down in action over the disputed Gulf of Sidra off the Libyan coast. Ribas-Dominicci and his weapons systems officer, Capt. Paul Lorence, were the only U.S. casualties of Operation El Dorado Canyon
- Frederick Lois Riefkohl, Rear Admiral, U.S. Navy; born Luis Federico Riefkohl Jaimieson; one of the first Puerto Ricans to graduate from the United States Naval Academy; in World War I became the first Puerto Rican to be awarded the Navy Cross
- Rudolph W. Riefkohl, Colonel, U.S. Army; played an instrumental role in helping the people of Poland overcome the 1919 typhus epidemic
- Demensio Rivera, Private, U.S. Army; received the Medal of Honor posthumously on March 18, 2014, for his courageous actions while serving as an automatic rifleman with 2d Platoon, Company G, 7th Infantry Regiment, 3d Infantry Division during combat operations against an armed enemy in Changyong-ni, Korea on May 23, 1951
- Manuel Rivera Jr., Captain, U.S. Marine Corps; of Puerto Rican descent; first U.S. serviceman to die in Operation Desert Shield
- Pedro N. Rivera, Brigadier General, U.S. Air Force; in 1994, became the first Hispanic to be named medical commander in the Air Force; responsible for the provision of health care to more than 50,000 patients
- Horacio Rivero, Admiral, U.S. Navy; in 1964, became the first Puerto Rican and second Hispanic Admiral (four-star) in the U.S. Navy; participated in World War II, Korean War, and Vietnam War; commander in 1962 of the American fleet sent by President John F. Kennedy during the Cuban Missile Crisis to set up a quarantine (blockade) of the Soviet ships in an effort to stop the Cold War from escalating into World War III
- Pedro Rodríguez, Master Sergeant, U.S. Army; member of Puerto Rico's 65th Infantry; earned two Silver Stars within a seven-day period during the Korean War
- Antonio Rodríguez Balinas, Brigadier General, U.S. Army; first commander of the Office of the First U.S. Army Deputy Command; during the Korean War he fought with Puerto Rico's 65th Infantry Regiment and was awarded the Silver Star
- Fernando E. Rodríguez Vargas, Major, U.S. Army; odontologist (dentist), scientist and a Major in the U.S. Army who in 1921 discovered the bacteria which causes dental caries
- Eurípides Rubio, Captain, U.S. Army; posthumously awarded the Medal of Honor for his actions at Tây Ninh Province in the Republic of Vietnam on November 8, 1966
- Héctor Santiago-Colón, Specialist Four, U.S. Army; posthumously awarded the Medal of Honor for his actions at Quảng Trị Province, Vietnam as member of Company B of the 5th Battalion, 7th Cavalry, 1st Cavalry Division
- Antulio Segarra, Colonel, U.S. Army; in 1943, became the first Puerto Rican Regular Army officer to command a Regular Army Regiment when he assumed the command of Puerto Rico's 65th Infantry Regiment, which was conducting security missions in the jungles of Panama
- Carmen Vazquez Rivera, First Lieutenant, U.S. Air Force. Vazquez was an early Puerto Rican female officer of the United States Army and Air Force who served in both World War II and the Korean War. Wife of Leopoldo Figueroa. Awarded the American Theater Campaign Medal, WWII Victory Medal, Overseas Service Bars (3), and National Defense Service Medal. Following her 100th birthday, Vazquez was awarded the League of United Latin American Citizens Presidential Medal of Freedom and honored by the United States Congress.
- Miguel A. Vera, Private, U.S. Army; was awarded the Medal of Honor posthumously for his courageous actions while serving as an automatic rifleman with Company F, 38th Infantry Regiment, 2d Infantry Division in Chorwon, Korea, on September 21, 1952
- Humbert Roque Versace, Captain, U.S. Army; of Italian and Puerto Rican descent; posthumously awarded the Medal of Honor for his heroic actions while a prisoner of war (POW) during the Vietnam War; first member of the U.S. Army to be awarded the Medal of Honor for actions performed in Southeast Asia while in captivity
- Raúl G. Villaronga, Colonel, U.S. Army; first Puerto Rican to be elected as mayor of a Texas city (Killeen)

21st century

- Marta Carcana, Major General, U.S. Army; in 2015, became the first woman to be named Adjutant General of the Puerto Rican National Guard
- Iván Castro, Captain, U.S. Army; of Puerto Rican descent; one of three blind active-duty officers who serves in the US Army; the only blind officer serving in the United States Army Special Forces
- Hilda I. Ortiz Clayton, Specialist, U.S. Army, was a combat photographer killed in 2013 when a mortar exploded during an Afghan training exercise; she was able to photograph the explosion that killed her and four Afghan soldiers. The 55th Signal Company named their annual competitive award for combat camera work "The Spc. Hilda I. Clayton Best Combat Camera (COMCAM) Competition" in her honor.
- Ramón Colón-López, Senior Enlisted Advisor to the Chairman, U.S. Air Force; a pararescueman; on June 13, 2007, was the first and only Hispanic among the first six airmen to be awarded the Air Force Combat Action Medal; Commandant of the Pararescue and Combat Rescue Officer School
- Olga E. Custodio, Lieutenant Colonel, U.S. Air Force; first female Hispanic U.S. military pilot; first Latina to complete U.S. Air Force military pilot training; after retiring, became the first Latina commercial airline captain
- Emilio Díaz Colón, Major General, U.S. Army; PRNG; first Superintendent of the Puerto Rican Police; served as the Adjutant General of the Puerto Rican National Guard
- Rafael O'Ferrall, Brigadier General, U.S. Army; first Hispanic and person of Puerto Rican descent to become the Deputy Commanding General for the Joint Task Force at Guantanamo, Cuba while simultaneously serving as Assistant Adjutant General (Army) and Deputy Commanding General of the Joint Force Headquarters at San Juan, Puerto Rico
- María Inés Ortiz, Captain, U.S. Army; of Puerto Rican descent; first United States Army nurse to die in combat during Operation Iraqi Freedom and the first to die in combat since the Vietnam War
- Hector E. Pagan, Brigadier General, U.S. Army; first Hispanic of Puerto Rican descent to become Deputy Commanding General of the U.S. Army John F. Kennedy Special Warfare Center and School at Fort Bragg, North Carolina
- Maritza Sáenz Ryan, Colonel, U.S. Army; of Puerto Ricana and Spanish descent; head of the Department of Law at the United States Military Academy; first woman and first Hispanic (Puerto Rican and Spanish heritage) West Point graduate to serve as an academic department head; the most senior ranking Hispanic Judge Advocate
- Marc H. Sasseville, Major General, U.S. Air Force; Puerto Rican mother; on September 11, 2001, was acting operations group commander under the 113th Wing of the DC Air National Guard; one of four fighter pilots commissioned with finding and destroying United Flight 93 by any means necessary, including ramming the aircraft in midair
- Noel Zamot, Colonel, U.S. Air Force, a native of Rio Piedras, was the first Hispanic commandant of the Air Force's elite Test Pilot School. He is also a former combat and test aviator with over 1900 hours in B-52, B-1B, B-2A, F-16D and over 20 other aircraft.
- Irene M. Zoppi, Brigadier General, U.S. Army; first Puerto Rican woman to reach the rank of Brigadier General in the United States Army; Deputy Commanding General – Support under the 200th Military Police Command at Fort Meade, Maryland; Bronze Star Medal recipient

== Physicians, scientists and inventors ==
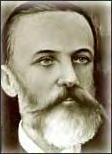
Agustin Stahl

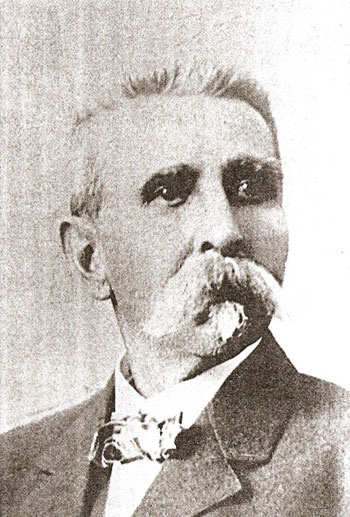
Fermín Tangüis

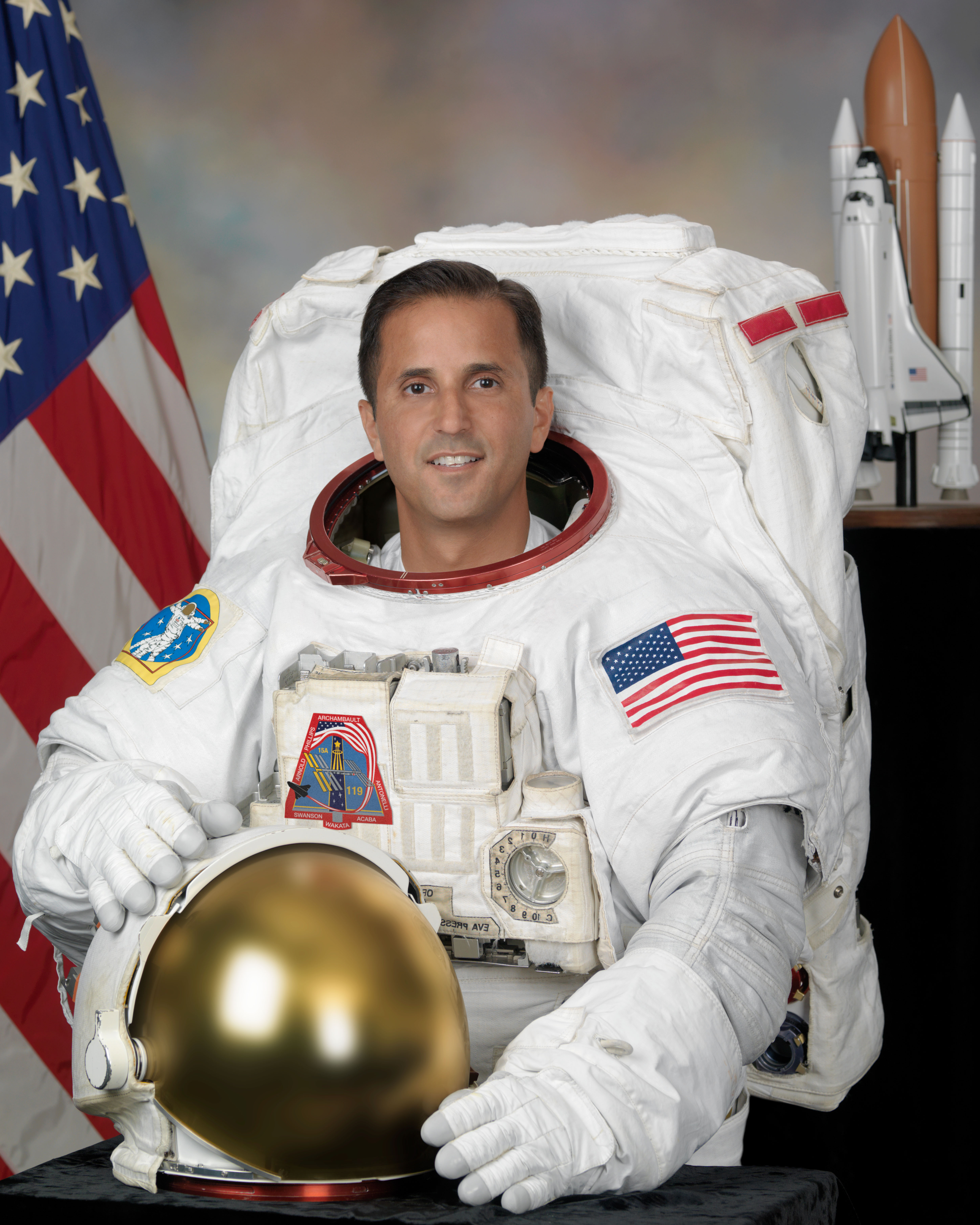
Joseph Acaba

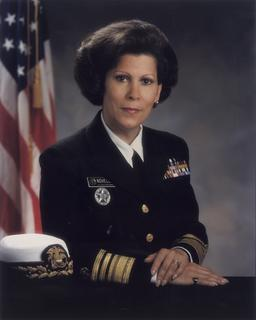
Antonia Novello – Surgeon General of the United States

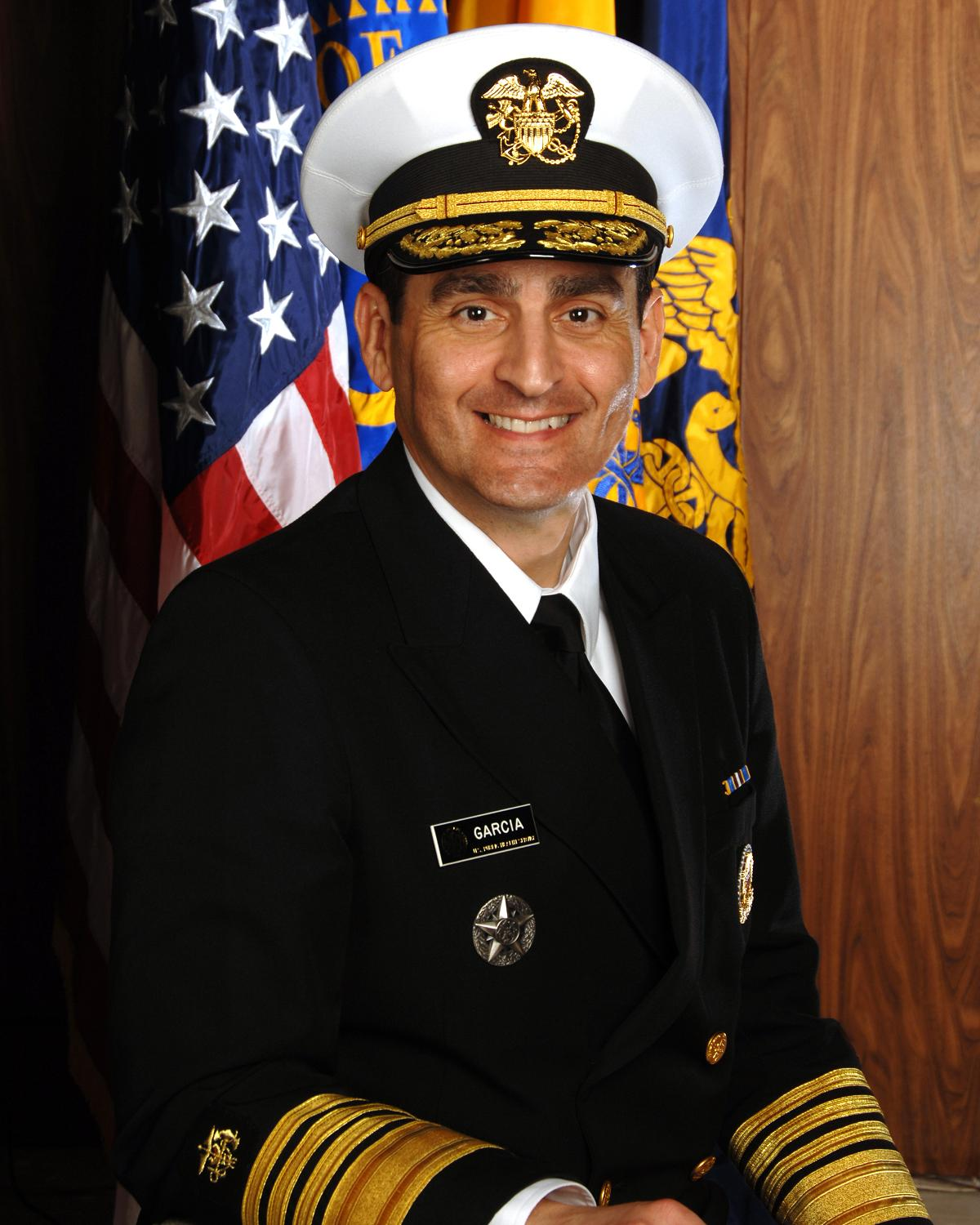
Joxel García – Assistant Secretary of Health for President George W. Bush

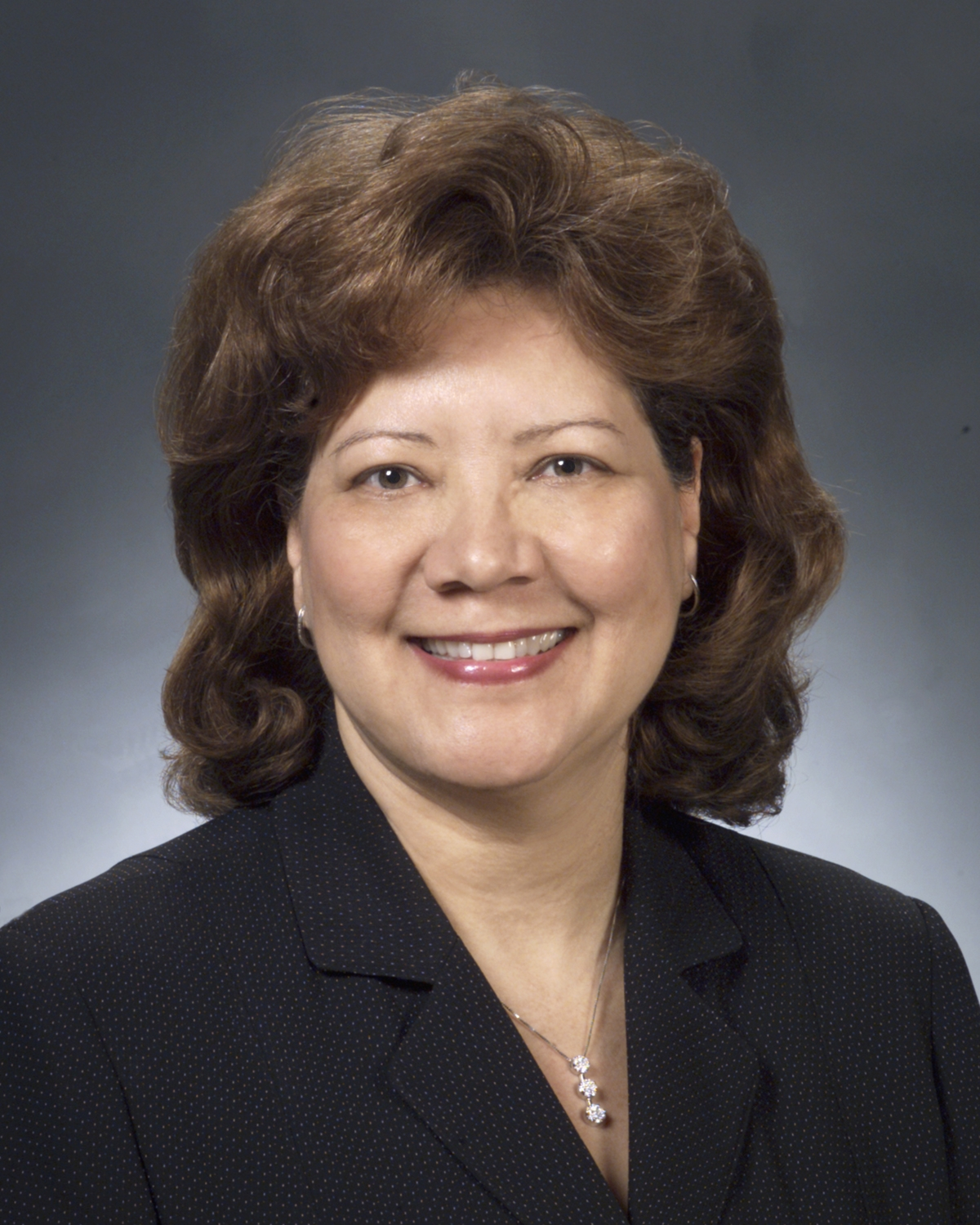
Olga D. González-Sanabria – member of the Ohio Women's Hall of Fame

- Joseph M. Acaba, scientist, educator, first Puerto Rican astronaut
- Carlos Albizu Miranda, psychologist; first Hispanic educator to have a North American university renamed in his honor; one of the first Hispanics to earn a PhD in psychology in the U.S.
- Ricardo Alegría, anthropologist, archaeologist and educator; "father of modern Puerto Rican archaeology"
- José Álvarez de Choudens, Secretary of Health of Puerto Rico
- Jorge N. Amely Vélez, electrical engineer and inventor; holds various patents in the field of medical technology
- Bailey K. Ashford, author, physician, soldier, and parasitologist; Colonel in the U.S. Army, arrived in Puerto Rico during the Spanish–American War and made the island his home; organized and conducted a parasite treatment campaign which cured approximately 300,000 people (one-third of the Puerto Rico population) and reduced the death rate from this anemia by 90 percent
- Pedro Beauchamp, surgeon; first Puerto Rican specialist certified by the American Reproductive Endocrinology and Infertility Board; performed the first in vitro fertilization technique on the island in 1985
- Víctor Manuel Blanco, astronomer; in 1959, discovered a "Blanco 1", a galactic cluster; second Director of the Cerro Tololo Inter-American Observatory in Chile, which has the largest 4-m telescope in the Southern Hemisphere; in 1995, the telescope was dedicated in his honor as the "Víctor M. Blanco Telescope", also known as the "Blanco 4m"
- Rafael L. Bras, former chair of Civil Engineering at MIT; leading expert on hydrometeorology and global warming
- Anthony M. Busquets, electronic engineer, aerospace technologist; involved in the development and application of multifunction control/display switch technology in 1983 and development and application of a microprocessor-based I/O system for simulator use in 1984
- Carlos E. Chardón, a.k.a. the "father of mycology in Puerto Rico"; first Puerto Rican mycologist; discovered the aphid "Aphis maidis", the vector of the mosaic of sugar cane, in 1922; author of the Chardón Plan; first Puerto Rican to hold the position of Chancellor of the University of Puerto Rico
- Nitza Margarita Cintron, scientist; Chief of NASA's (JSC) Space and Health Care Systems Office
- Pablo Clemente-Colon, first Puerto Rican chief scientist of the National Ice Center (2005–present)
- Antonia Coello Novello, physician; first Hispanic and first woman U.S. Surgeon General (1990–93)
- Ernesto Colón Yordán, Secretary of Health of Puerto Rico
- Martín Corchado (born 1839), physician, medical researcher, and president of the Autonomist Party of Puerto Rico
- José F. Cordero, pediatrician; founding director of the National Center on Birth Defects and Developmental Disabilities at the Centers for Disease Control and Prevention
- Milagros J. Cordero, pediatrician; founder and President of Team Therapy Services For Children
- María Cordero Hardy, physiologist, educator and scientist; did important research on vitamin E
- Juan R. Cruz, NASA scientist, played an instrumental role in the design and development of the Mars Exploration Rover parachute
- Carlos Del Castillo, NASA scientist; Program Scientist for the Ocean Biology and Biogeochemistry Program at NASA; recipient of the Presidential Early Career Award for Scientists and Engineers award, the highest honor bestowed by the U.S. government on scientists and engineers beginning their independent careers
- Manuel de la Pila Iglesias, multi-faceted physician; introduced the first EKG and X-ray machines into Puerto Rico; founded a medical clinic which today houses a respected medical center in Ponce
- Rurico Diaz Rivera, cardiologist; first Chief of Medicine at the University of Puerto Rico School of Medicine; leader in United States research for dengue fever
- Alfonso Eaton, mechanical engineer, aerospace technologist; first Puerto Rican to work for NASA
- Enectalí Figueroa-Feliciano, astronaut applicant and astrophysicist with NASA; pioneered the development of position-sensitive detectors
- Orlando Figueroa, mechanical engineer at NASA; former director for Mars exploration and the director for the Solar System Division in the Office of Space Science; now director, applied engineering & technology at the NASA, Goddard Space Flight Center; as director of engineering he manages the full scope of engineering activities at Goddard
- Adolfo Figueroa Viñas, first Puerto Rican astrophysicist at NASA working in solar plasma physics; senior research scientist; involved in many NASA missions such as Wind, SOHO, Cluster and MMS projects
- José N. Gándara, lead physician attending to the wounded of the Ponce massacre and later an expert witness at the trials of the "Nacionalistas" as well as before the Hays Commission; held numerous government positions, including Secretary of Health of Puerto Rico; co-founded the Popular Democratic Party of Puerto Rico
- Joxel García, first Puerto Rican Assistant Secretary for Health, U.S. Department of Health and Human Services; Admiral in the United States Public Health Service Commissioned Corps
- Mario García Palmieri, cardiologist; first Hispanic to be designated a "Master" by the American College of Cardiology
- Sixto González, scientist; first Puerto Rican Director of the Arecibo Observatory, with the world's largest single dish radio telescope
- Rosa A. González, registered nurse; founded the Association of Registered Nurses of Puerto Rico; wrote various books related to her field in which she denounced the discrimination against women and nurses in Puerto Rico.
- Isaac González Martínez, urologist; first Puerto Rican urologist; pioneer in the fight against cancer in the island
- Olga D. González-Sanabria, NASA engineer; highest ranking Hispanic at NASA Glenn Research Center; member of the Ohio Women's Hall of Fame
- Amri Hernández-Pellerano, NASA engineer; designs, builds and tests the electronics that regulate the solar array power at NASA's Goddard Space Flight Center
- Gloria Hernandez, physical scientist, aerospace technologist; Science Manager for the Stratospheric Aerosol and Gas Experiment at NASA Langley Research Center; her supersonic aerodynamic research has resulted in economic advances in supersonic flight
- Lucas G. Hortas, aerospace engineer and technologist; author and or co-author of over 35 technical papers
- Chris Kubecka (full name Christina Kubecka de Medina), a computer chaiist specialist in cyberwarfare, established international business operations for Saudi Aramco after the world's most devastating Shamoon cyber warfare attacks. Detected and helped halt the second wave of July 2009 cyberattacks cyberwar attacks against South Korea.
- Ramón E. López, physicist; professor in the Department of Physics at the University of Texas at Arlington; Fellow of the American Physical Society; recipient of the 2002 Nicholson Medal for Humanitarian Service; co-authored a book on space weather, Storms from the Sun
- Fernando López Tuero, agricultural scientist and agronomist; discovered the bug (believed at first to be a germ) which was destroying Puerto Rico's sugar canes
- Carlos A. Liceaga, electronic engineer, aerospace technologist; leads the development of proposal guidelines, and the technical, management, and cost evaluation of the proposals For the Explorer Program
- Ariel Lugo, scientist and ecologist; Director of the International Institute of Tropical Forestry in the U.S. Department of Agriculture Forest Service, based in Puerto Rico; founding member of the Society for Ecological Restoration; member-at-large of the Board of the Ecological Society of America
- Melissa Cristina Márquez, "Mother of Sharks," marine biologist, author, and science communicator
- Debbie Martínez, computer engineer, aerospace technologist; Flight Systems and Software Branch software manager for the Cockpit Motion Facility at NASA Langley Research Center
- Lissette Martinez, electronic engineer, rocket scientist; lead electrical engineer for the Space Experiment Module program at NASA's Wallops Flight Facility
- Manuel Martínez Maldonado, nephrologist, educator; author of numerous scientific publications; discovered a natriuretic hormone
- Antonio Mignucci, marine biologist, oceanographer; founder of "Red Caribeña de Varamientos"
- Carlos Ortiz Longo, NASA engineer and scientist, and pilot
- Joseph O. Prewitt Díaz, psychologist; specialized in psychosocial theory; recipient of the American Psychological Association's 2008 International Humanitarian Award
- Mercedes Reaves, research engineer and scientist; responsible for the design of a viable full-scale solar sail and the development and testing of a scale model solar sail at NASA Langley Research Center
- Ron Rivera, inventor and workshop organizer; invented life-saving water filters based on pottery
- Juan A. Rivero, scientist and educator; founded the Dr. Juan A. Rivero Zoo in Mayagüez, has discovered numerous animal species; author of several books
- Miriam Rodón Naveira, NASA scientist; first Hispanic woman to hold the Deputy Directorship for the Environmental Sciences Division in the National Exposure Research Laboratory
- Miguel Rodríguez, mechanical engineer; Chief of the Integration Office of the Cape Canaveral Spaceport Management Office
- Pedro Rodriguez, inventor, mechanical engineer; director of a test laboratory at NASA; invented a portable, battery-operated lift seat for people suffering from knee arthritis
- Helen Rodríguez Trías, physician and activist; first Latina president of the American Public Health Association; a founding member of the Women's Caucus of the American Public Health Association; recipient of the Presidential Citizen's Medal
- Fernando E. Rodríguez Vargas, dental scientist; discovered the bacteria which causes dental cavities
- Monserrate Roman, scientist, microbiologist; helped build the International Space Station
- Gualberto Ruaño, biotechnology pioneer and founder of Genomas, Inc.; pioneer in the field of personalized medicine; inventor of a system used worldwide for the management of viral diseases; President and founder of Genomas, a genetics-related company; director of genetics research at Hartford Hospital's Genetic Research Center
- José Francisco Salgado, Emmy-nominated astronomer, visual artist, and science communicator; former astronomer at the Adler Planetarium in Chicago; member of the audiovisual ensemble Bailey-Salgado Project
- Ulises Armand Sanabria, of Puerto Rican and French descent; developed mechanical televisions and early terrestrial television broadcasts
- Eduardo Santiago Delpín, surgeon; wrote the first book in Spanish about organ transplants
- Yajaira Sierra Sastre, astronaut; part of a NASA project on astronaut nutrition and health; She will live for four months isolated in a planetary module at a base in Hawaii to simulate life at a future base on Mars
- Diego R. Solís, physician; performed the first simultaneous pancreas and kidney transplant in Puerto Rico
- Félix Soto Toro, electrical engineer, astronaut applicant; developed the Advanced Payload Transfer Measurement System (ASPTMS), an electronic 3D measuring system
- Agustín Stahl, scientist in the fields of botany, ethnology and zoology
- Ramón M. Suárez Calderon, scientist, cardiologist, educator and hematologist; his investigations led to the identification of the proper and effective treatment of a type of anemia known as Tropical Espru, the application of complex methods, such as electrocardiography and radioisotope, to be used in clinics and the identification and treatment of the disease which causes heart rheumatism
- Fermín Tangüis, scientist, agriculturist and entrepreneur; developed the Tanguis cotton in Peru and saved that nation's cotton industry
- Dr. Neil deGrasse Tyson, astrophysicist, television and radio host; Puerto Rican mother; director of the Hayden Planetarium in New York City; host of the PBS series Cosmos: A Personal Voyage

== Politicians ==
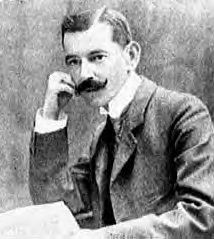
José de Diego – the "father of the Puerto Rican Independence Movement"

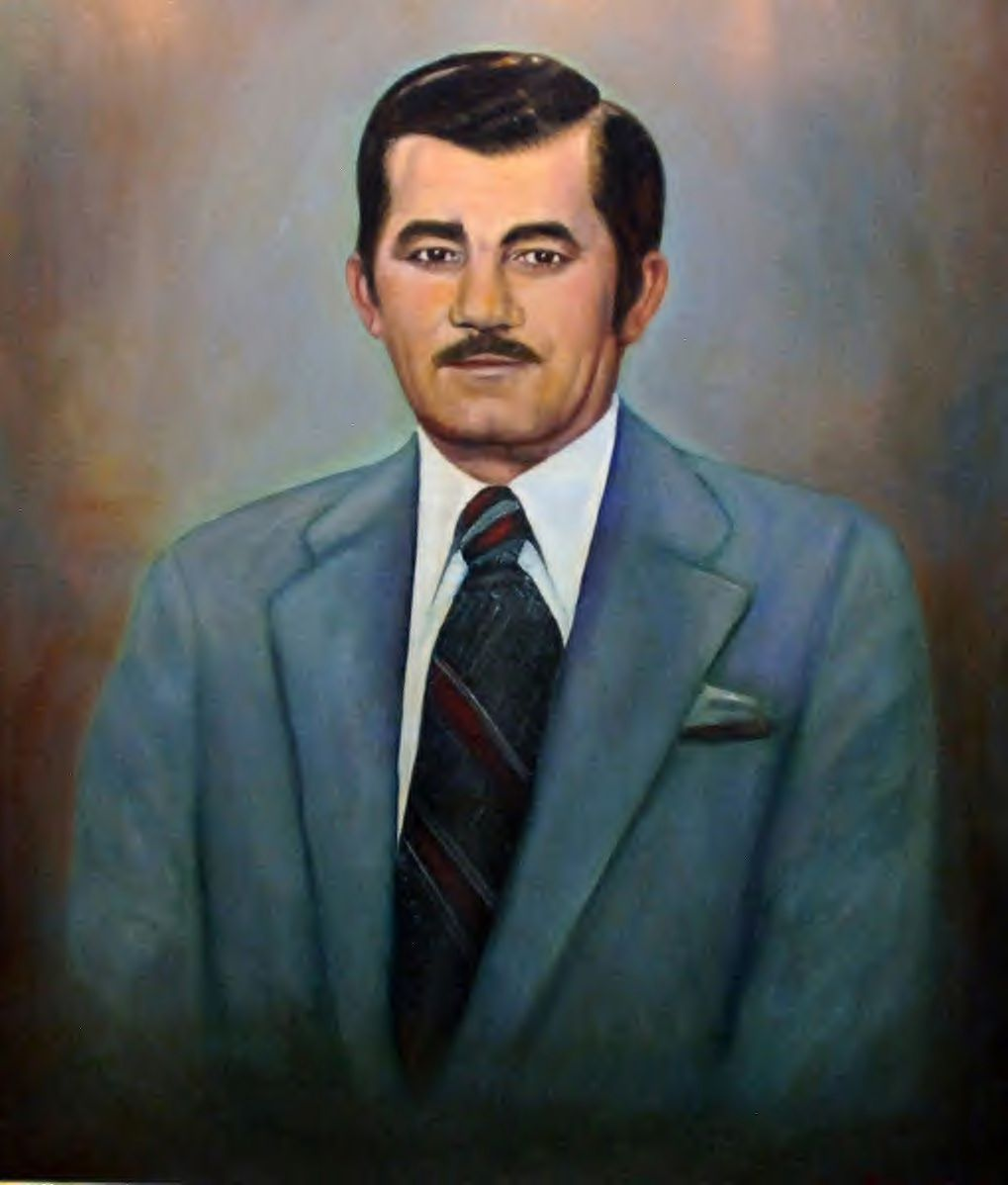
Juan Cancel Ríos - was a Puerto Rican politician and lawyer who served as the 7th President of the Senate of Puerto Rico

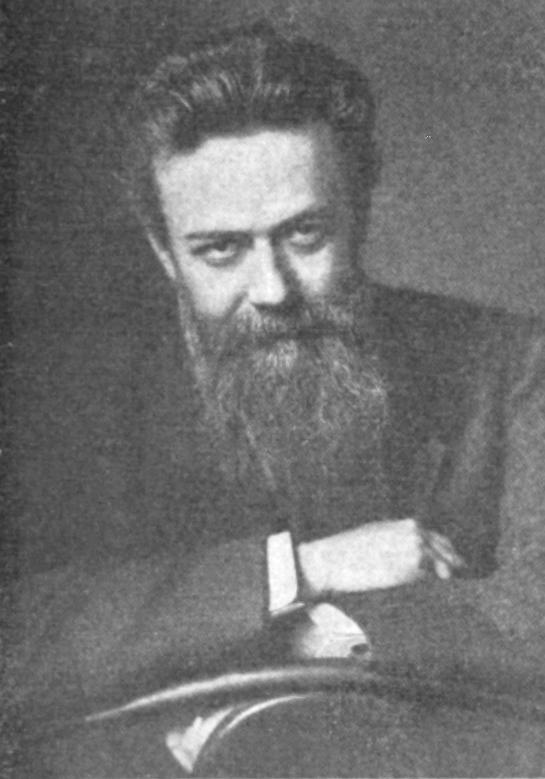
Federico Degetau – writer, author, and resident commissioner

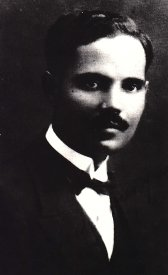
Pedro Albizu Campos – President and principal leader of the Puerto Rican Nationalist Party

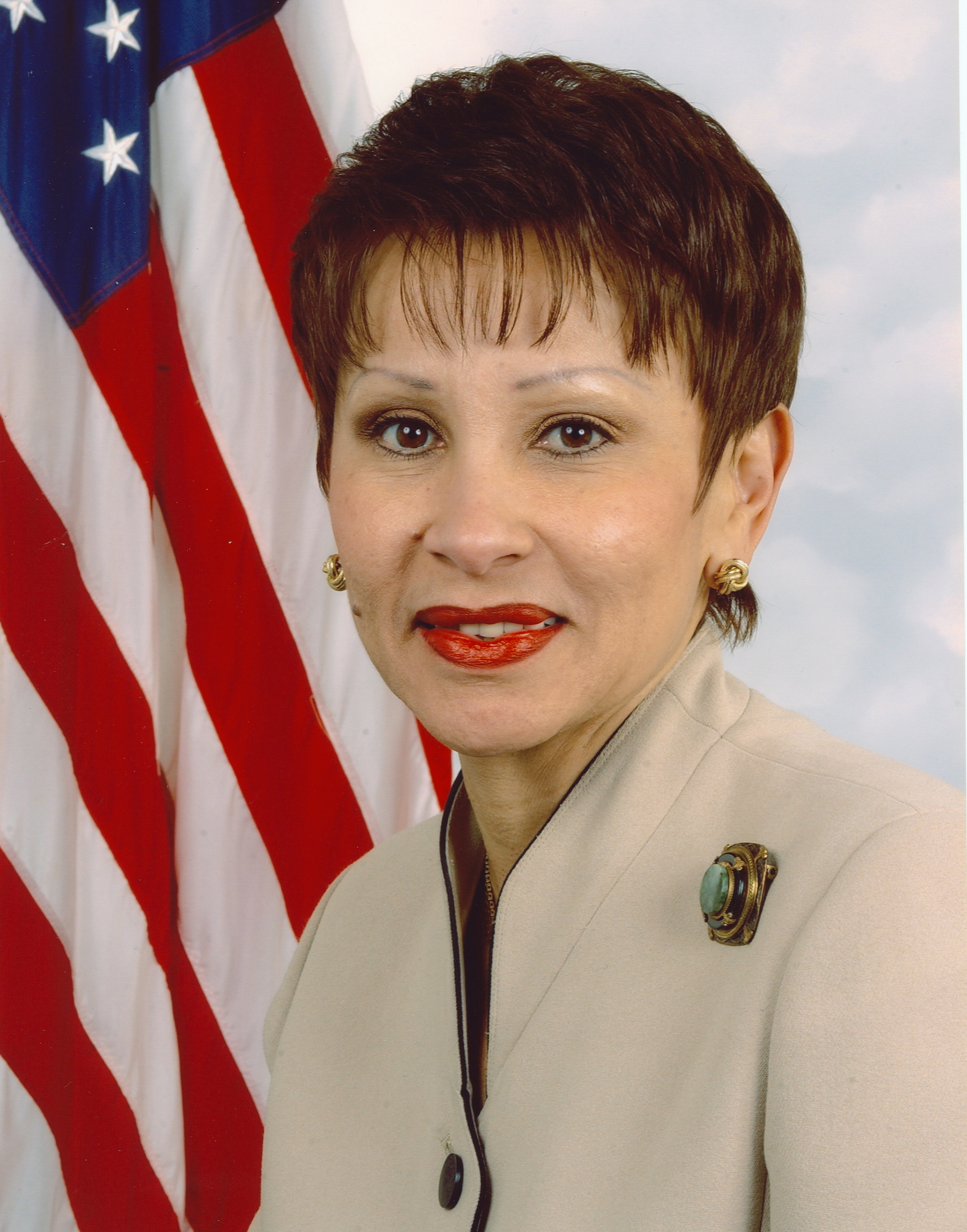
Nydia Velázquez – Congresswoman from New York City

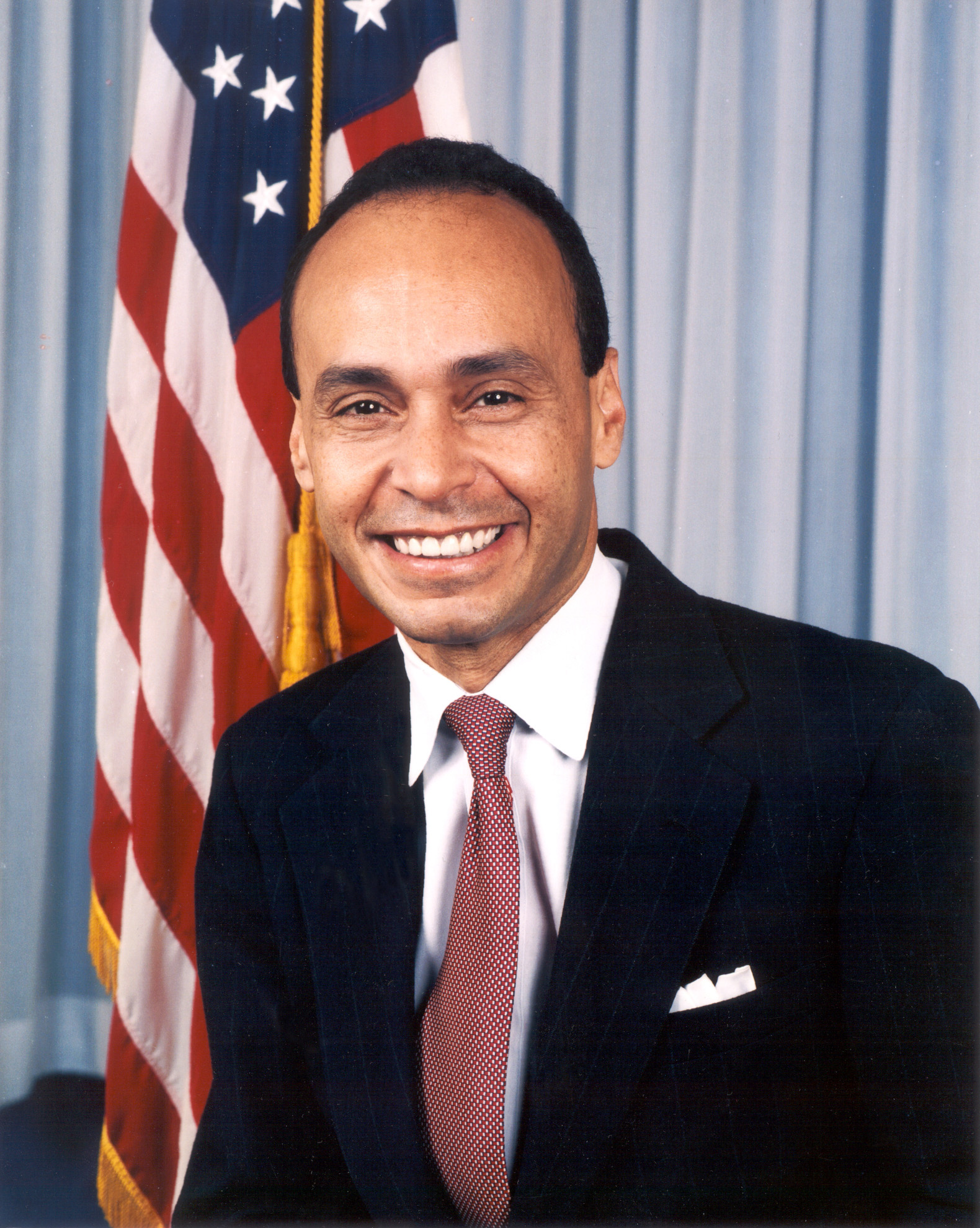
Luis Gutiérrez – Congressman from Chicago

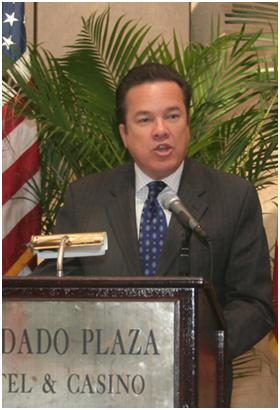
Kenneth McClintock – Secretary of State of Puerto Rico

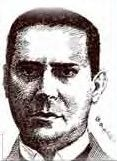
José Coll y Cuchí – founder of the Puerto Rican Nationalist Party

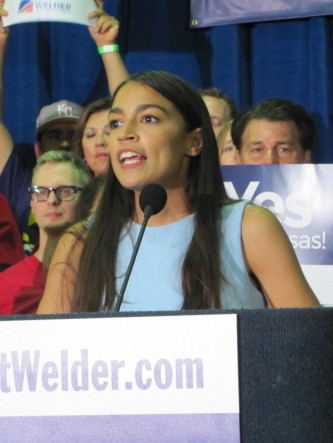
Alexandria Ocasio-Cortez, representing parts of The Bronx and Queens, is the youngest woman ever to be elected to Congress in November 2018.

19th century

- Román Baldorioty de Castro, "the father of Puerto Rico's autonomy"
- José Celso Barbosa, "the father of Puerto Rico's statehood movement"
- Ramón Emeterio Betances y Alacán, "father of the Puerto Rican nation"; main leader of the Grito de Lares revolution
- Eugenio María de Hostos y Bonilla, a.k.a. "El Gran Ciudadano de las Américas" (the Great Citizen of the Americas), educator, philosopher, intellectual, lawyer, sociologist, and independence advocate
- José M. Dávila Monsanto, senator, politician and lawyer; a co-founder of the Partido Popular Democrático de Puerto Rico
- José de Diego y Martínez, "the father of the Puerto Rican independence movement"; elected to the House of Delegates, the only locally elected body of government allowed by the U.S.; presided 1904–1917
- Federico Degetau, first resident commissioner to the U.S.
- José María Marxuach Echavarría, the only Puerto Rican to serve as the mayor of San Juan under both Spanish and American rule; served in 1897 for the Liberal Reformista Party and 1900–01 for the Puerto Rican Republican Party
- Antonio Mattei Lluberas, leader of the second and last major revolt against Spanish colonial rule in Puerto Rico in the Intentona de Yauco of 1897; mayor of Yauco 1904–1906
- Rosendo Matienzo Cintrón, political leader; in his early political career favored Puerto Rican statehood and later became an advocate for Puerto Rico's independence and founder of the Independence Party of Puerto Rico
- Luis Muñoz Rivera, former Resident Commissioner, journalist, politician (father of Luis Muñoz Marín)
- Ramón Power y Giralt, first Vice President of the Cortes of Cádiz (1810–1813)
- Francisco Mariano Quiñones, first president of Puerto Rico's Autonomic Cabinet
- Francisco Ramírez Medina, President of the Republic of Puerto Rico (September 23, 1868) during the Grito de Lares revolt
- Segundo Ruiz Belvis, leader of the Grito de Lares revolt
- Manuel Zeno Gandía, novelist and leader of cooperative movement in Puerto Rico

20th century

- Baltasar Corrada del Río, former Resident Commissioner 1977–1985; Mayor of San Juan 1985–1989; 1988 NPP gubernatorial candidate, Secretary of State 1992–1995; Supreme Court Justice 1995–2005
- Juan Cancel Ríos; was a Puerto Rican politician and lawyer who served as the 7th President of the Senate of Puerto Rico.
- Héctor Luis Acevedo; former Mayor of San Juan; 1996 PDP gubernatorial candidate
- Pedro Albizu Campos, President and principal leader of the Puerto Rican Nationalist Party
- José S. Alegría, poet, writer, lawyer and politician; a founding member of the Puerto Rican Nationalist Party and its president from 1928 to 1930
- Santos P. Amadeo, "champion of hábeas corpus"; former Senator in the Puerto Rico legislature
- María Luisa Arcelay, first woman in Puerto Rico elected to a government legislative body
- José Enrique Arrarás, politician, educator, attorney, public servant and sports leader
- Carmen E. Arroyo, first Puerto Rican woman elected to any state assembly, chair New York Hispanic Legislative Caucus
- Herman Badillo, first Puerto Rican to serve in U.S. Congress
- Joaquín Balaguer, former president of Dominican Republic (Puerto Rican father)
- Antonio R. Barceló, founder of the Puerto Rican Liberal Party; first president of the Senate of Puerto Rico.
- Josefina Barceló Bird de Romero (birth name: Maria Antonia Josefina Barceló Bird), elected president of the Liberal Party after her father died in 1938; first woman elected to lead a major political party in Puerto Rico
- Ángel O. Berríos, former Mayor of Caguas
- Rubén Berríos Martínez, President of the Puerto Rican Independence Party
- Juan Bosch, former president of Dominican Republic (Puerto Rican mother)
- Adolfo Carrión Jr., former Bronx (New York City) borough president
- Adam Clayton Powell IV, former member of the New York State Assembly
- Severo Colberg Ramírez, served as a member of the Puerto Rico House of Representatives, and was the Speaker from 1982 to 1985
- Gilberto Concepción de Gracia, founder of the Puerto Rican Independence Party
- Cayetano Coll y Cuchí, first President of Puerto Rico House of Representatives
- José Coll y Cuchí, founder of the Puerto Rican Nationalist Party
- Maria Colón Sánchez, activist and politician; in 1988, became the first Hispanic woman elected to the Connecticut General Assembly
- Rafael Cordero, former Mayor of Ponce
- Miguel del Valle, Illinois State Senator; first Latino City Clerk of Chicago; 2011 mayoral candidate
- Nelson Antonio Denis, former New York State Assemblyman
- Rubén Díaz Sr., New York State Senator and religious leader
- Antonio Fernós Isern, first Puerto Rican cardiologist and the longest serving Resident Commissioner of Puerto Rico in the United States Congress
- Leopoldo Figueroa, co-founder of the Independence Association, one of three political organizations which merged to form the Puerto Rican Nationalist Party; changed political ideals and in 1948 was a member of the Partido Estadista Puertorriqueño (Puerto Rican Statehood Party); the only member of the Puerto Rico House of Representatives that year who did not belong to the Partido Popular Democrático (PPD), he opposed the PPD's approval of the bill that became the Ley de la Mordaza (Gag Law), which violated the civil rights of those who favor(ed) Puerto Rican independence
- Maurice Ferre, former Mayor of Miami, Florida
- Fernando Ferrer, former Bronx (New York City) borough president and New York City mayoral candidate
- Rogelio Figueroa, 2008 gubernatorial candidate and founder of Puerto Ricans for Puerto Rico Party
- Oscar García Rivera Sr., former New York State Assemblyman; in 1937 became the first Puerto Rican elected to public office in the continental U.S.; in 1956, became the first Puerto Rican to be nominated as the Republican candidate for Justice of the City Court
- Miguel A. García Méndez, youngest Speaker of the House in Puerto Rico's history; the Mayagüez General Post Office was named after him
- María Libertad Gómez Garriga, the only woman in the Constitutional Convention of Puerto Rico, formed in 1951; the only woman to sign the 1952 Constitution of Puerto Rico
- Luis Gutiérrez, United States Representative from Illinois
- Santiago Iglesias, founder of the first Puerto Rico Socialist Party, labor activist and former Resident Commissioner
- Margarita López, former New York City Council member and political activist
- Juan Francisco Luis, 24th governor of the United States Virgin Islands, 1978–1987
- Juan Mari Brás, founder of the Movimiento Pro Independencia and the modern Puerto Rican Socialist Party
- Antonio "Tony" Méndez, first native-born Puerto Rican to become a district leader of a major political party in New York City
- Olga A. Méndez, first Puerto Rican New York State Senator
- Teodoro Moscoso, architect of Operation Bootstrap; former U.S. Ambassador to Venezuela (1961–1964)
- Victoria Muñoz Mendoza, 1992 PDP candidate for governor (daughter of Luis Muñoz Marín)
- Luis Muñoz Rivera, Senator; last surviving drafter of the Puerto Rico Constitution
- Félix Ortiz, New York State Assemblyman, author of nation's first cellphone driving ban
- George Pabey, Mayor of East Chicago, Indiana
- Hernán Padilla, former Mayor of San Juan, founder of the Puerto Rican Renewal Party
- Antonio Pagán, former New York City Council member
- Eddie Perez, former Mayor of Hartford, Connecticut
- María de Pérez Almiroty, first woman to be elected senator in Puerto Rico
- Samuel R. Quiñones, longest serving President of the Senate of Puerto Rico
- Ernesto Ramos Antonini, former Speaker of Puerto Rico's House of Representatives
- Charles Rangel, United States Congressman (Puerto Rican father)
- Roberto Rexach Benítez, former Senate President, educator; current columnist for the El Vocero newspaper
- Felisa Rincón de Gautier, first woman to be elected Mayor of a capital city in the Americas (Western Hemisphere)
- Ramón Luis Rivera, Mayor of Bayamón 1977–2001
- Manuela Santiago Collazo, Mayor of Vieques (1985–2000)
- Jorge Santini, former three-term Mayor of San Juan and Vice President of the New Progressive Party, former senator
- José E. Serrano, most senior Puerto Rican congressman, Chair of House Appropriations subcommittee on Financial Services
- Gloria Tristani, first Hispanic woman appointed as one of the commissioners of the Federal Communications Commission (FCC)
- Nydia Velázquez, first Puerto Rican congresswoman, Chair of House Small Business Committee
- Raúl G. Villaronga, first Puerto Rican elected mayor in Texas (Killeen)

21st century

- Liston Bochette, Olympian and politician
- Richard Carmona, 17th Surgeon General of the United States
- Lorraine Cortés-Vázquez, former Secretary of State of New York
- Rubén Díaz Jr., former New York State Assemblyman; Bronx Borough President (2009–present)
- Wilda Diaz, first female mayor of Perth Amboy, New Jersey; first Puerto Rican, first woman, and first Latino elected mayor in New Jersey
- Jenniffer González, Governor of Puerto Rico (2025–present); former resident commissioner to the U.S. and former Speaker of the Puerto Rico House of Representatives
- Pablo Hernández Rivera, Resident commissioner to the U.S. House of Representatives
- Raúl Labrador, Idaho Attorney General and former congressman representing Idaho's 1st congressional district in the U.S. House of Representatives
- Saige Martin, Raleigh City Councilman
- Kenneth McClintock, 13th President of the Puerto Rico Senate; 22nd Secretary of State/Lieutenant Governor of Puerto Rico
- Hiram Monserrate, former New York State Senator
- Antonia Novello, 14th Surgeon General of the U.S.; Vice Admiral, Public Health Service Commissioned Corps
- Alexandria Ocasio-Cortez, Democratic congresswoman representing New York's 14th congressional district in the U.S. House of Representatives
- Cesar A. Perales, 67th Secretary of State of New York
- Pedro Pierluisi, Governor of Puerto Rico (2021–2025); de facto governor of Puerto Rico (2019); Secretary of Justice (1993–1997); Resident Commissioner (2009–2017)
- Roberto Prats, co-chair of winning Hillary Clinton primary campaign; Democratic State Chair; former senator and PDP congressional candidate
- John Quiñones, first Republican Party candidate of Puerto Rican ancestry elected to Florida House of Representatives
- Thomas Rivera Schatz, 14th President of the Senate of Puerto Rico
- Melinda Romero Donnelly, three-term at-large legislator, two terms in House, one in Senate Senate; Caribbean Business journalist
- Pedro Segarra, Mayor of Hartford, Connecticut
- Darren Soto, Representative in Florida House of Representatives, Florida Senate and the U.S. House of Representatives.
- Manuel A. Torres, Puerto Rico's first Electoral Comptroller, and longest serving modern Secretary of the Senate of Puerto Rico
- Daryl Vaz, Minister of Information and Telecommunication for Jamaica (Puerto Rican mother)
- Hydee Feldstein Soto, Los Angeles City Attorney; born and raised in San Juan, Puerto Rico; first female City Attorney and first Latina elected to citywide office in Los Angeles

== Sports ==
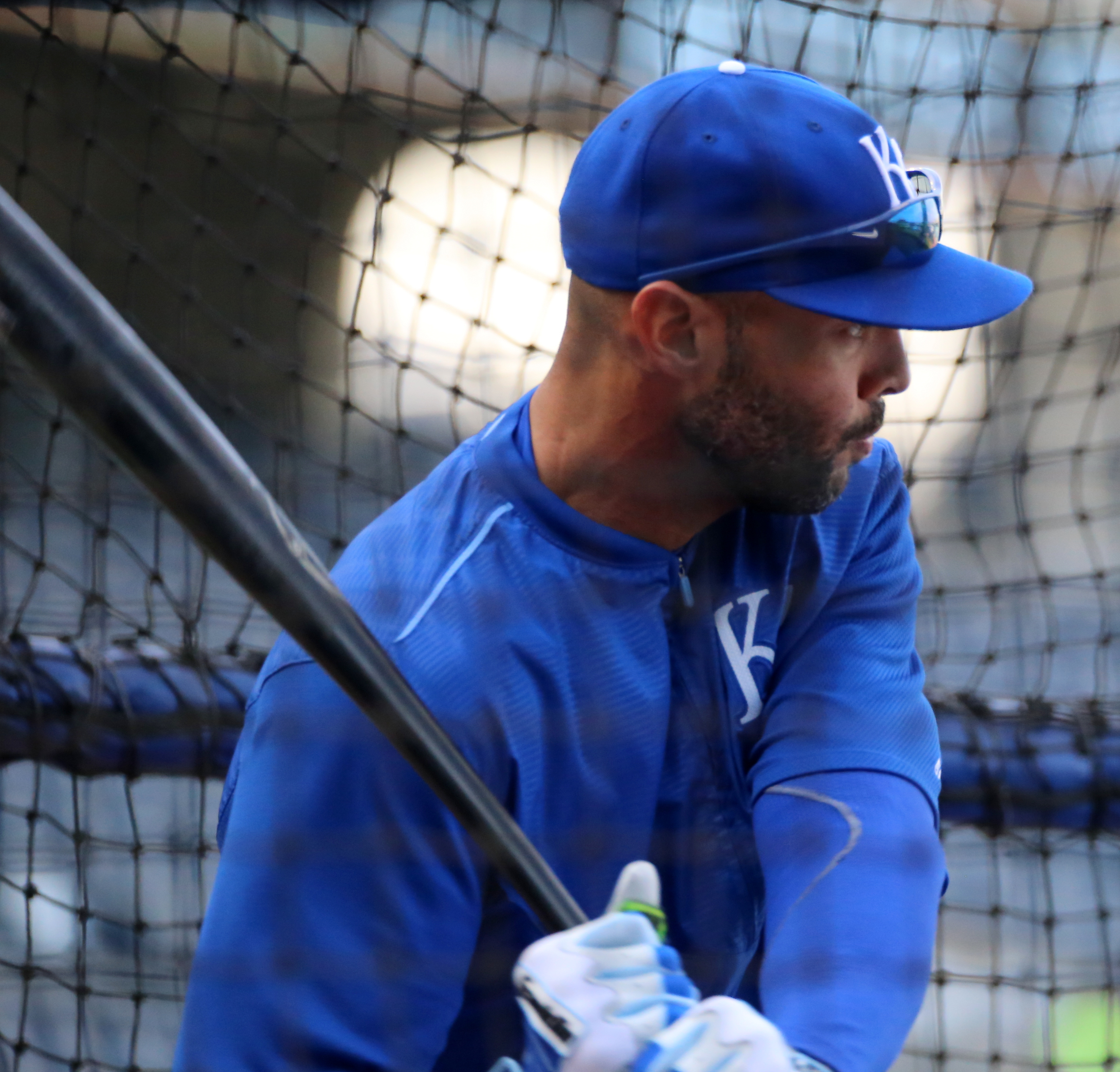
Alex Ríos is an American former professional baseball player.

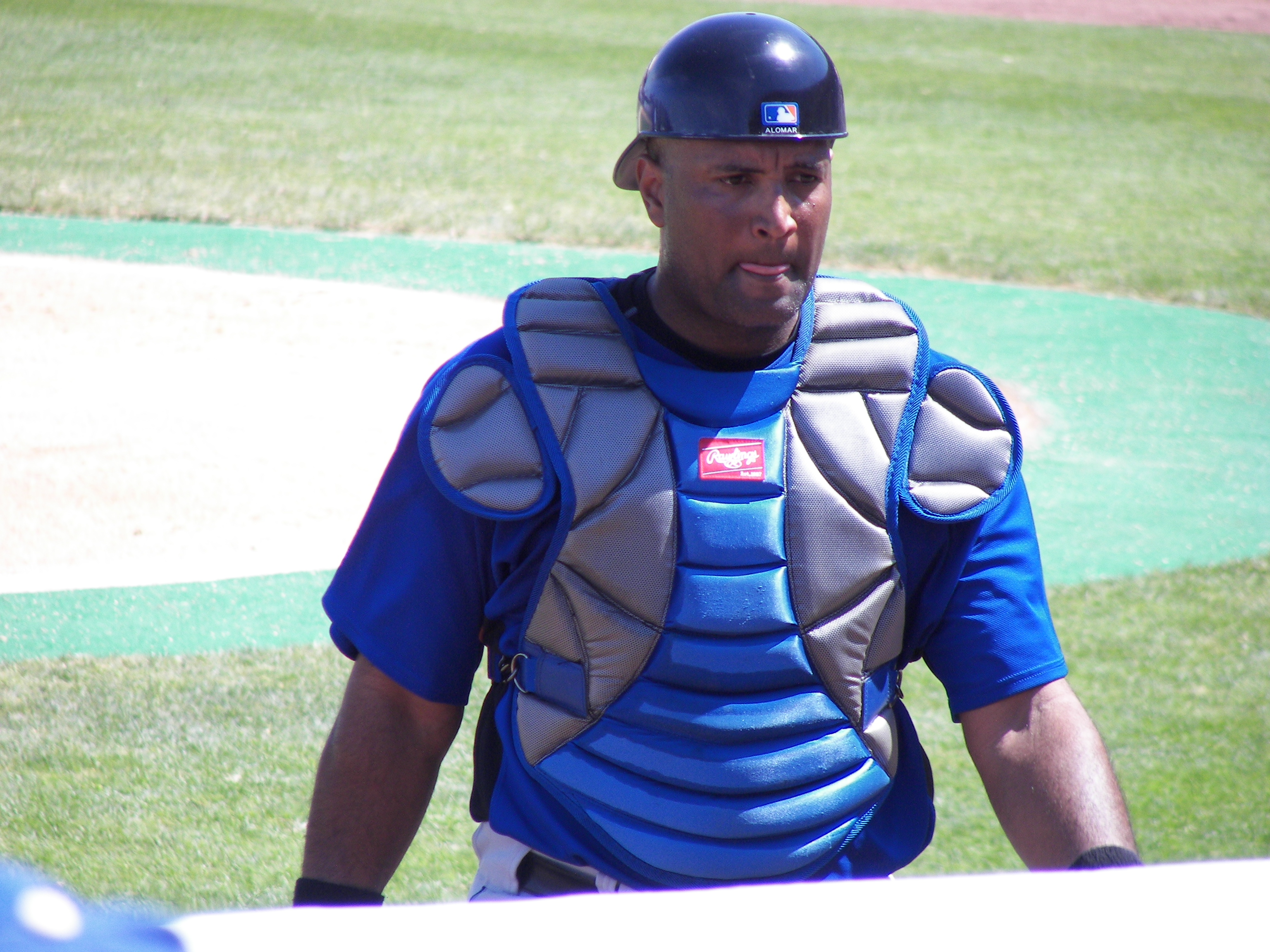
Santos "Sandy" Alomar – Cleveland Indians baseball player

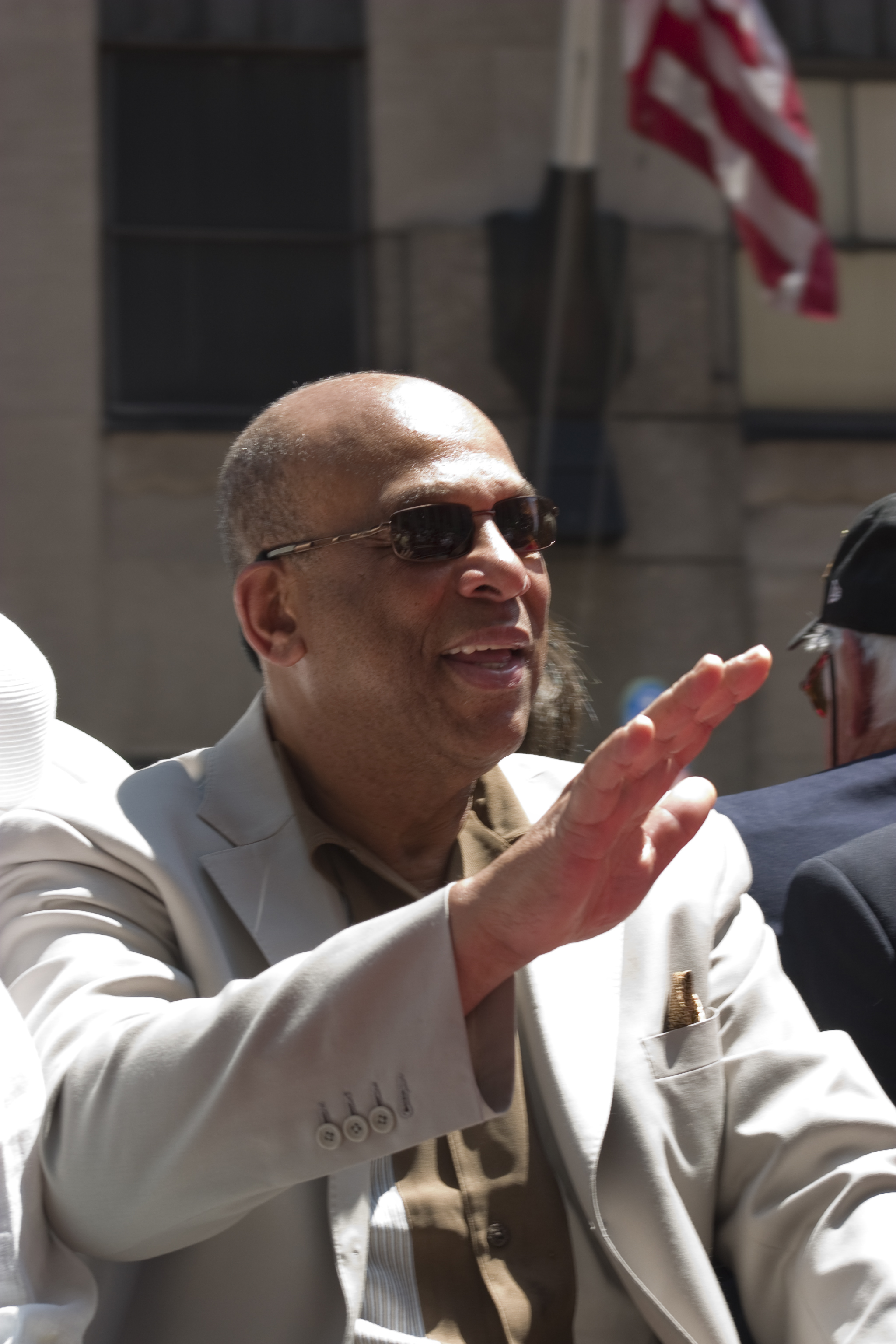
Orlando Cepeda – MLB first baseman, second Puerto Rican in Baseball Hall of Fame

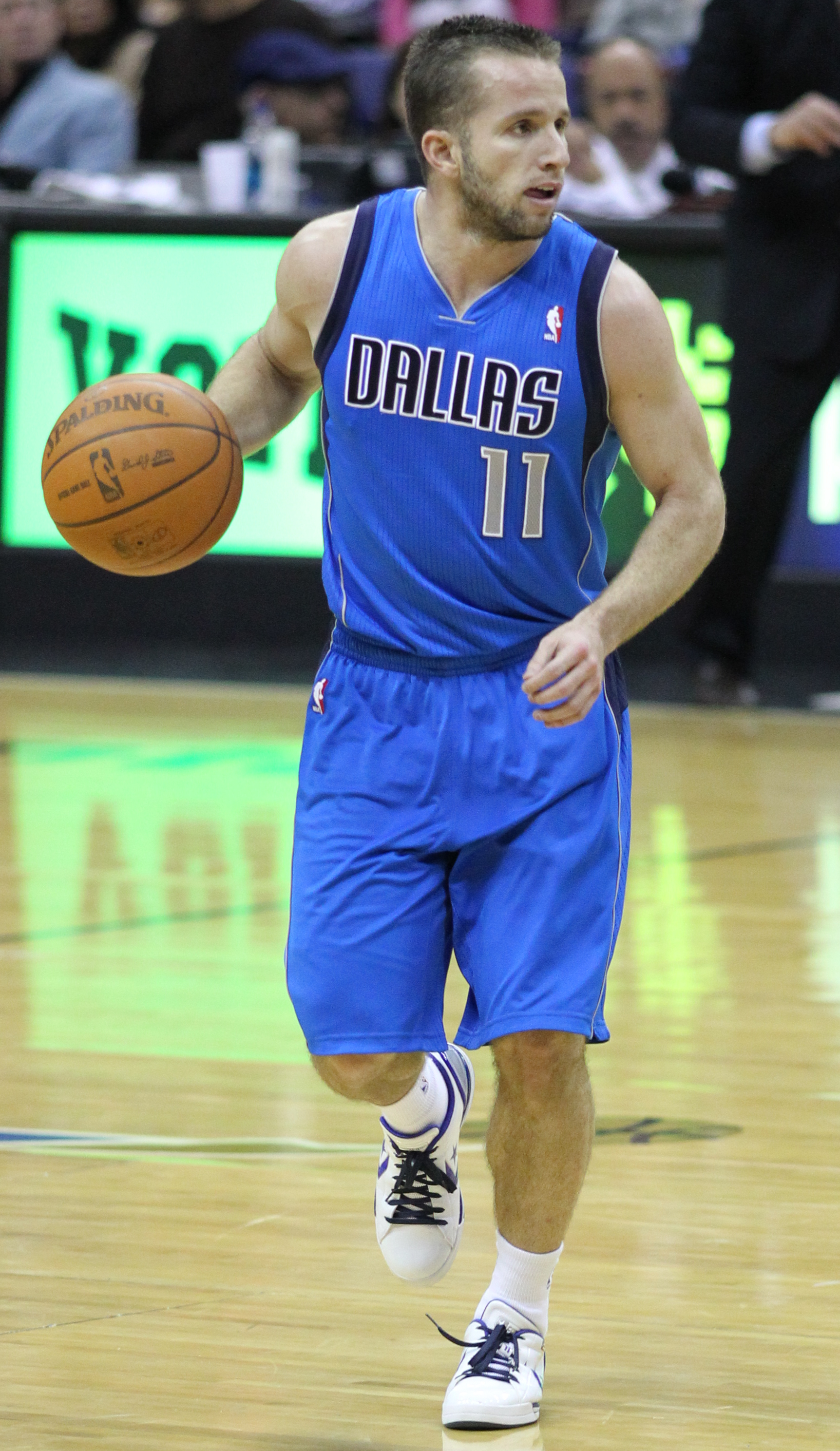
J. J. Barea – professional basketball player with the Dallas Mavericks

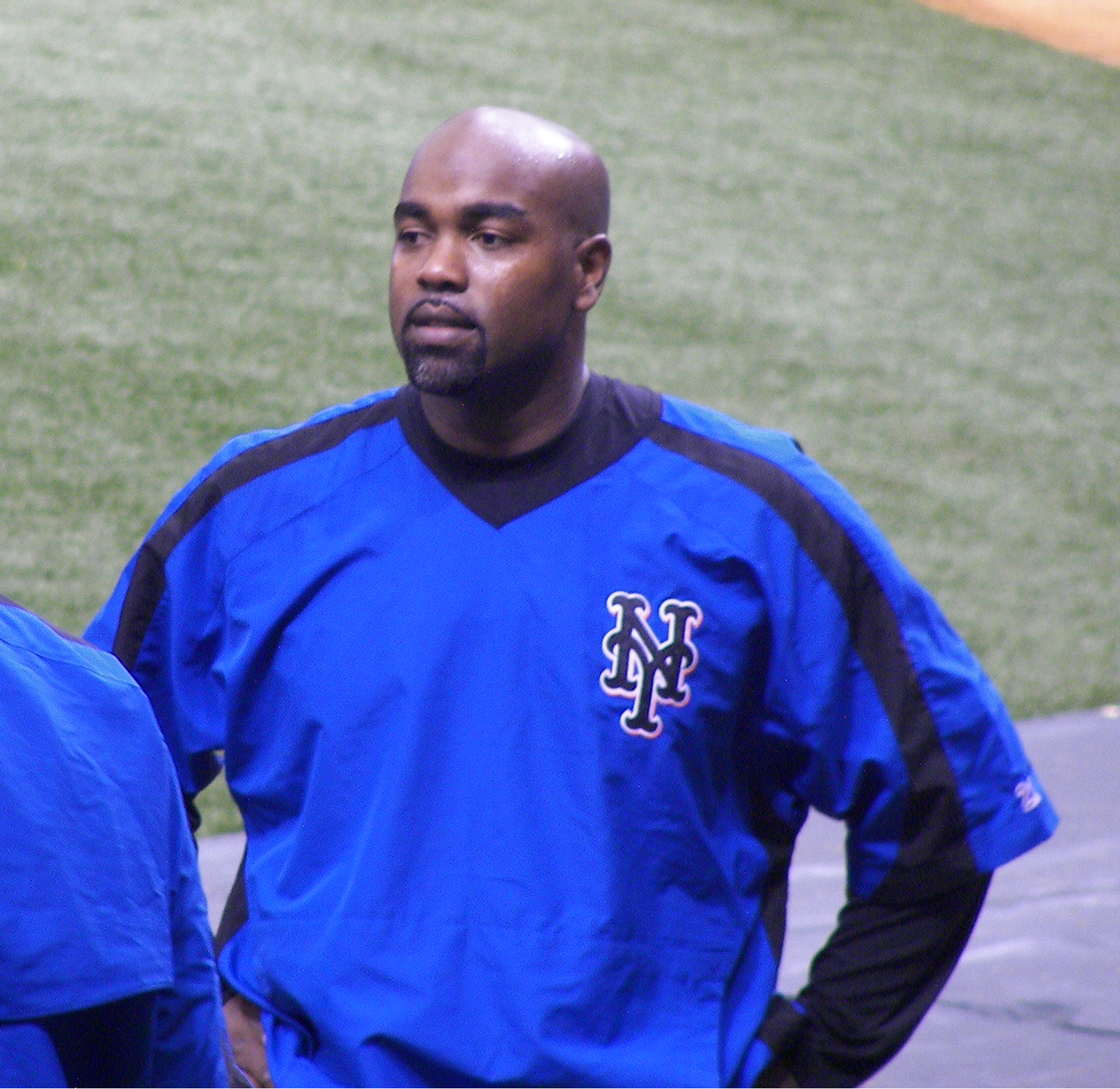
Carlos Delgado – MLB player, New York Mets

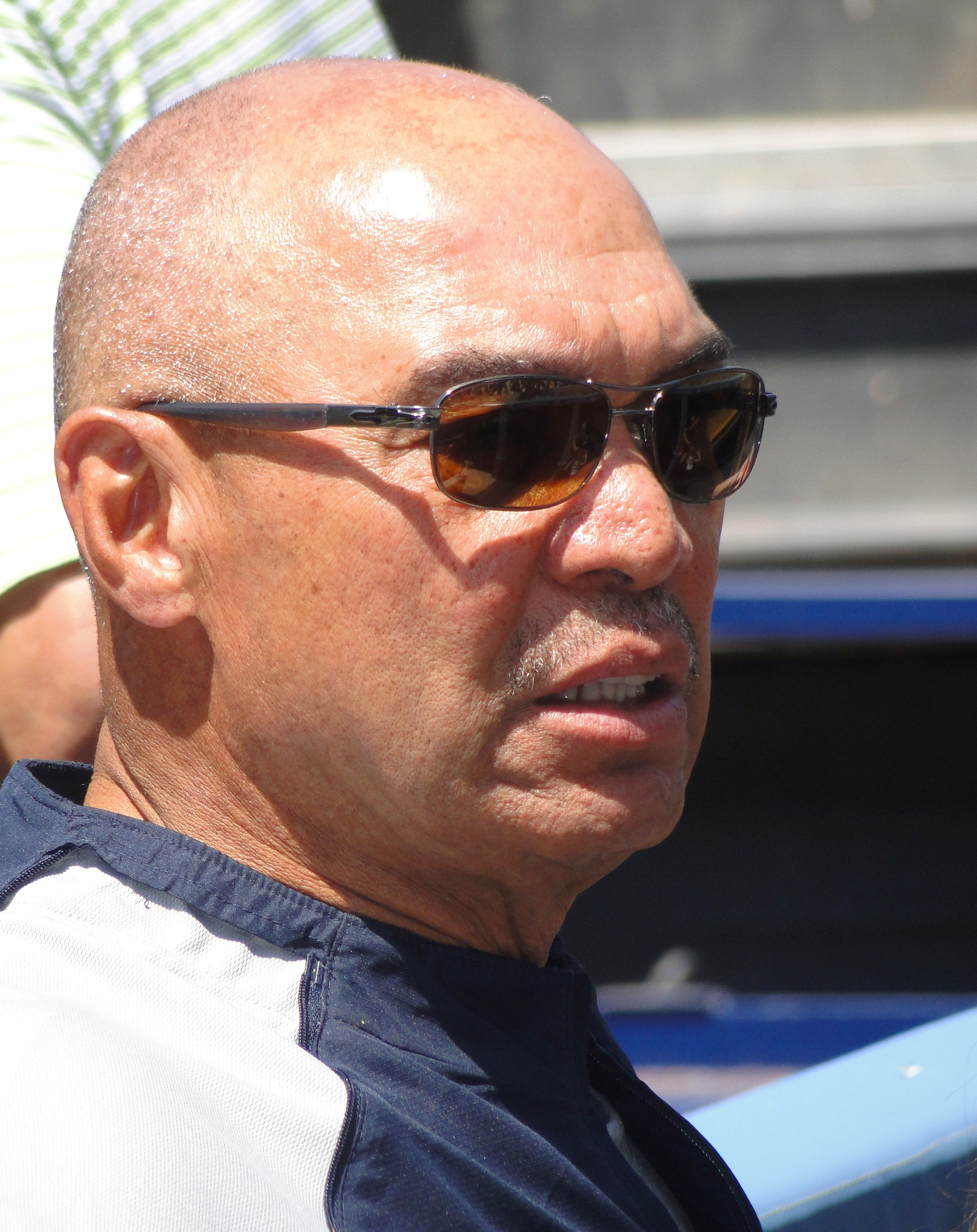
Reggie Jackson – Major League Baseball right fielder

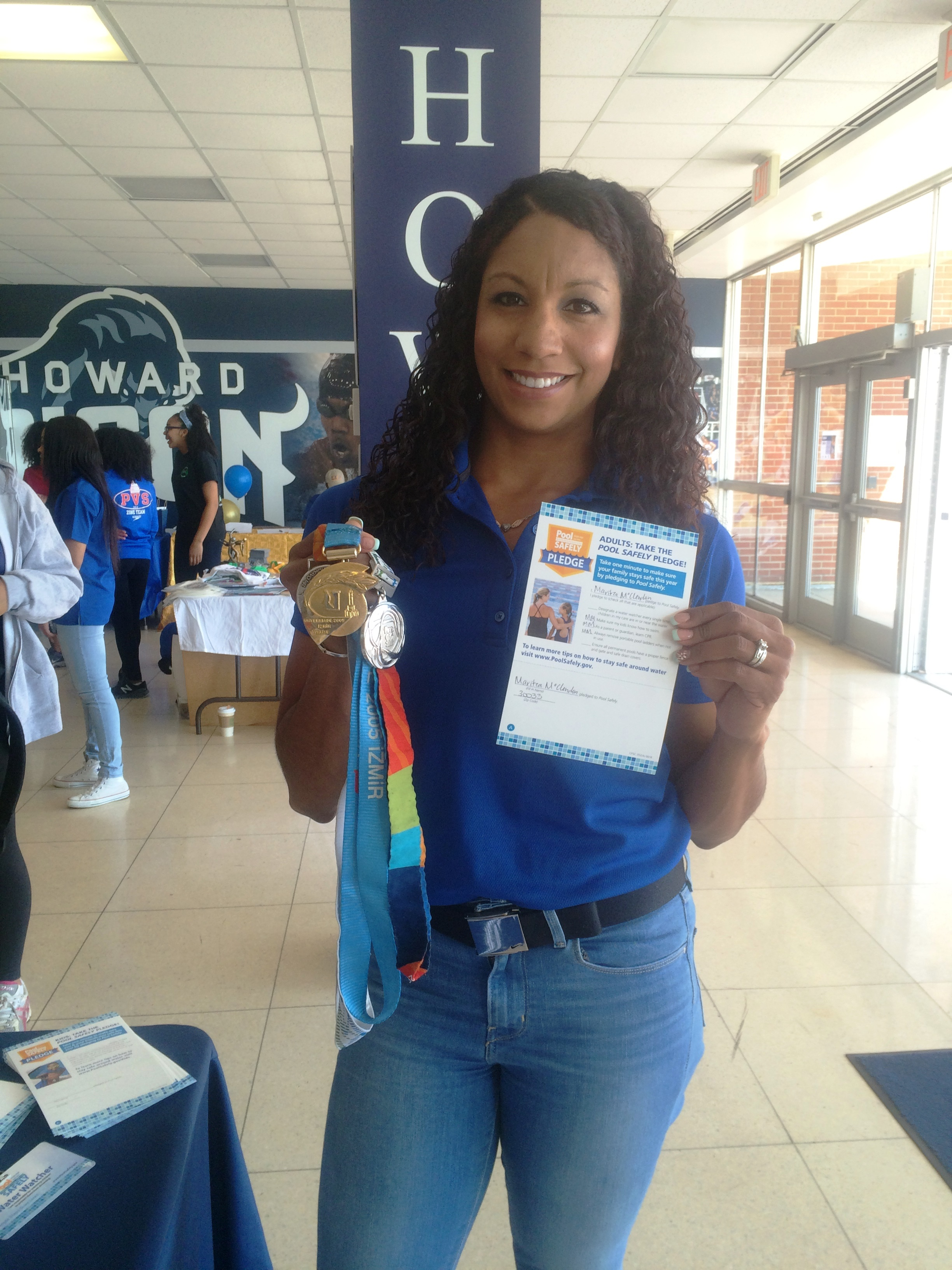
Maritza Correia

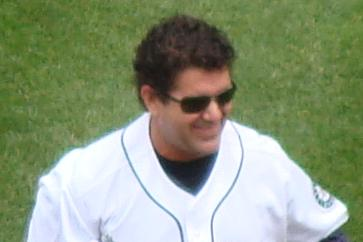
Edgar Martínez – MLB player with the Seattle Mariners

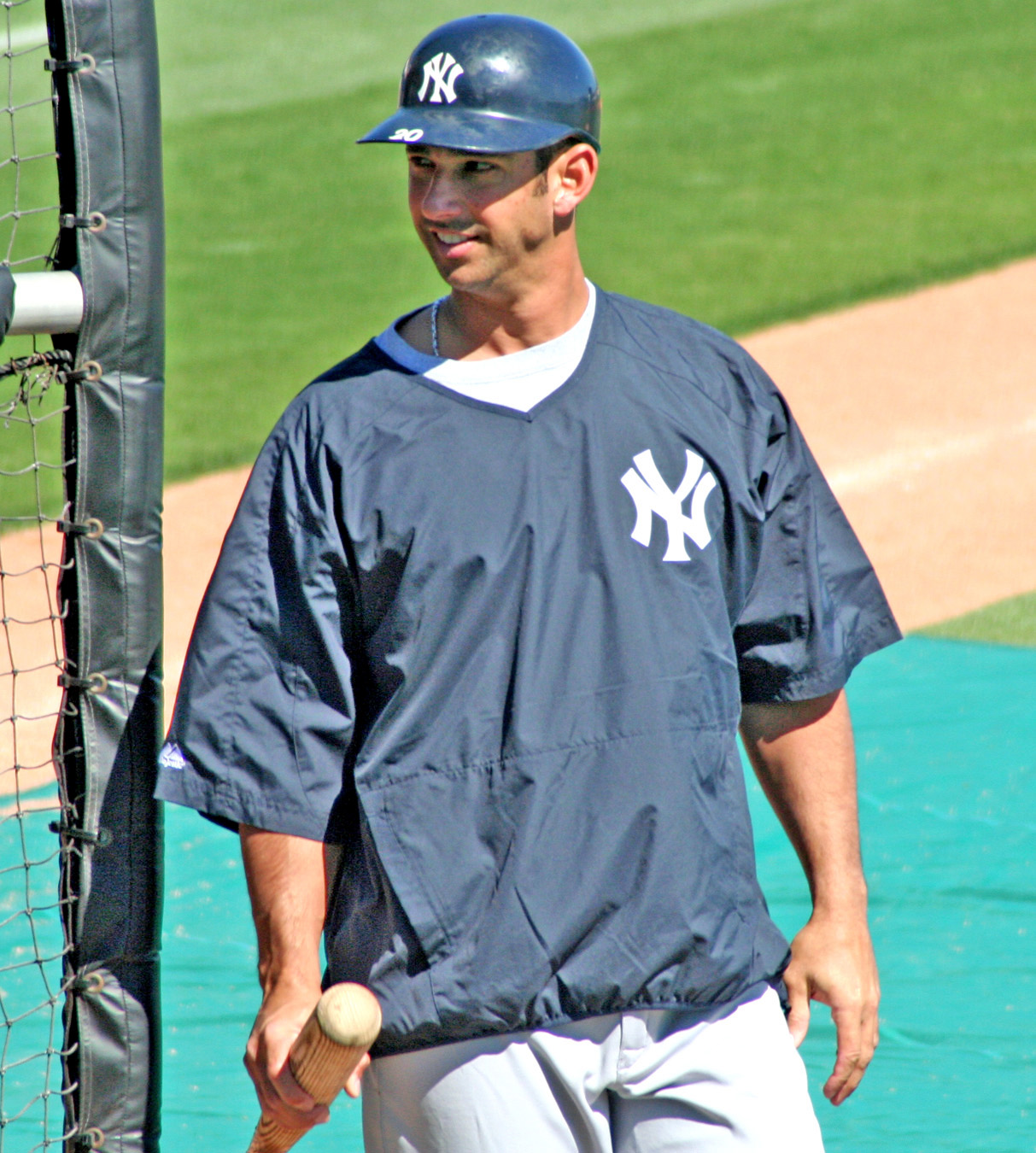
Jorge Posada – New York Yankees catcher

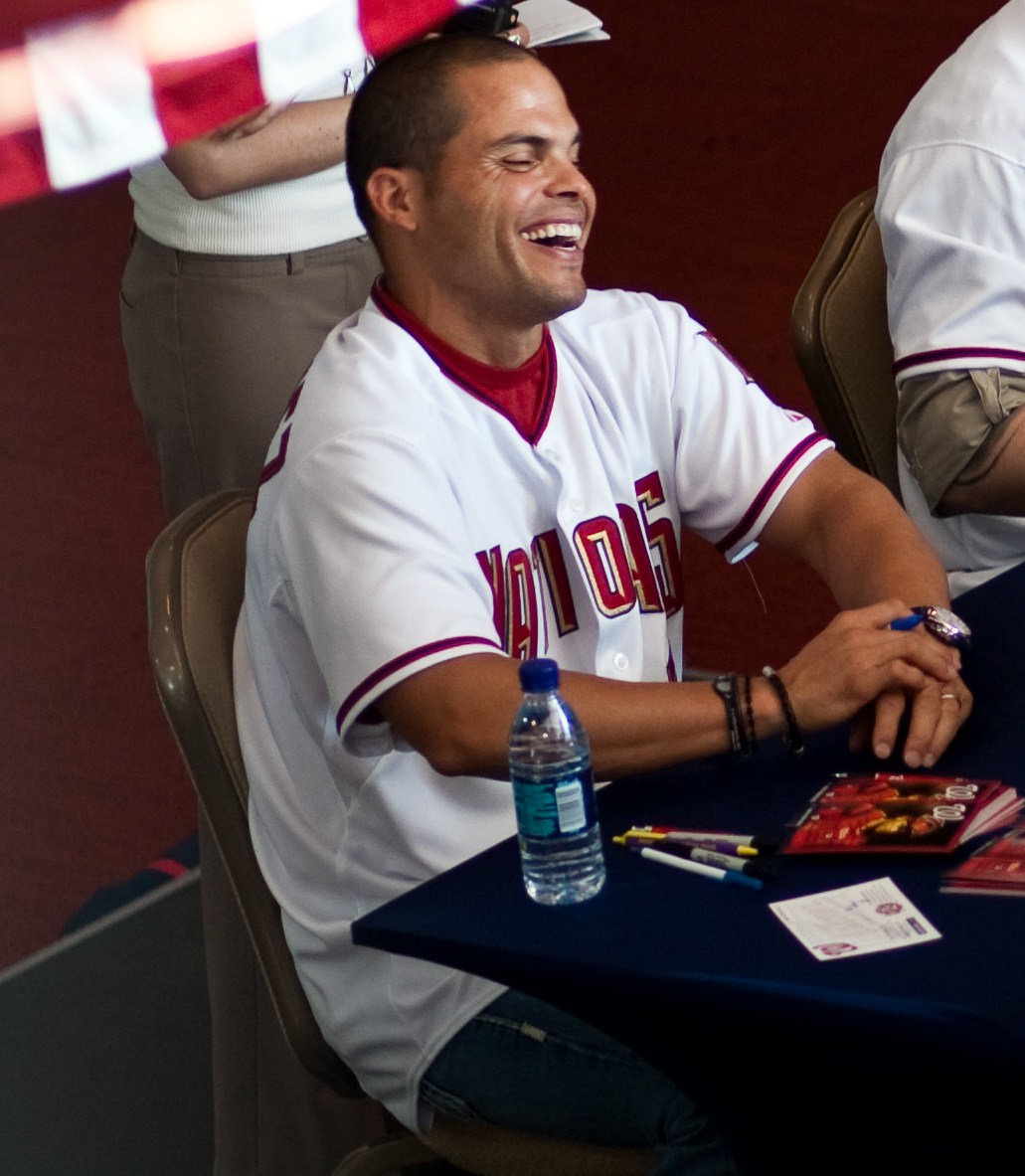
Iván Rodríguez – MLB catcher for the Washington Nationals

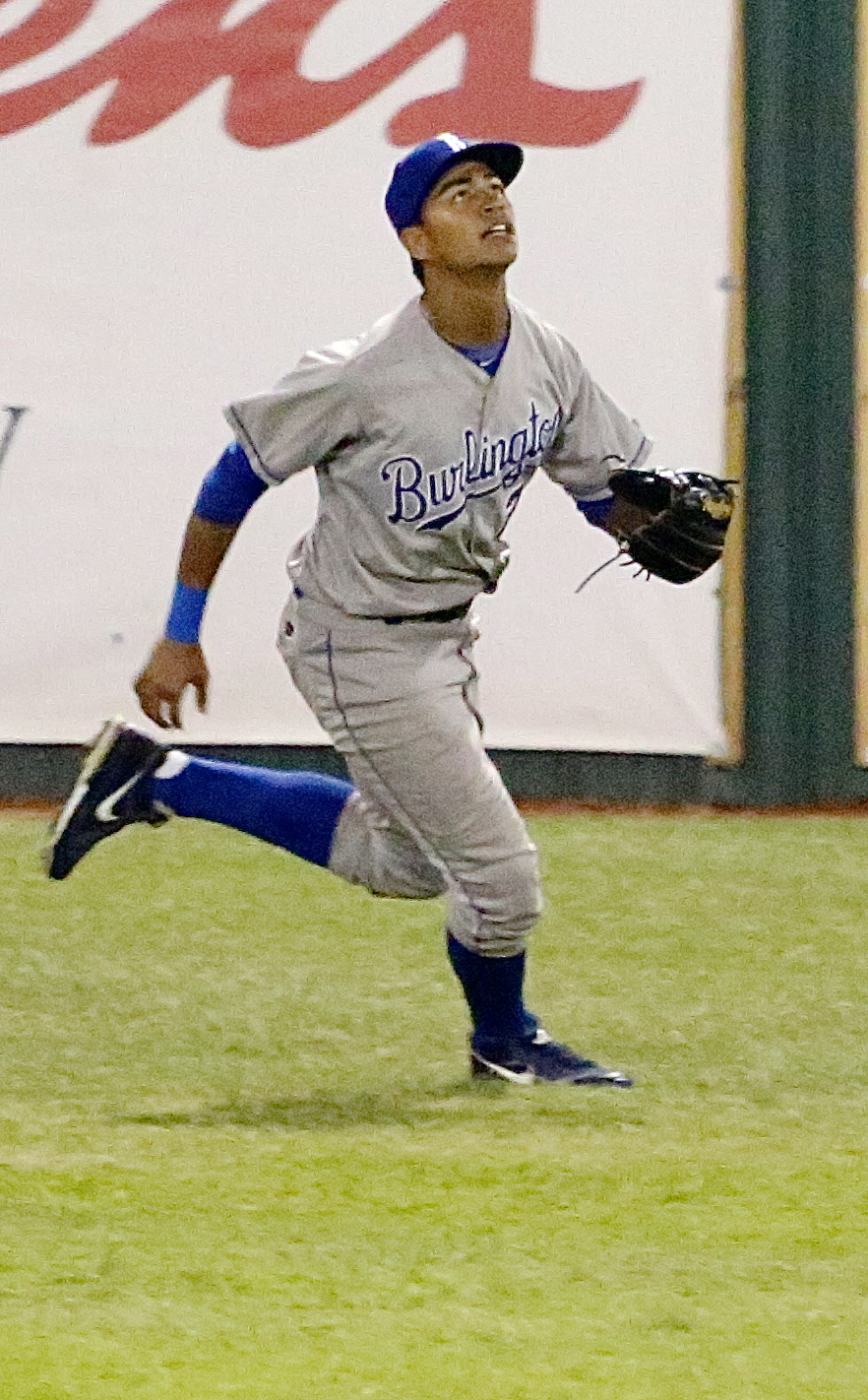
Alfredo L. Escalera – Kansas City Royals outfielder; youngest player ever drafted

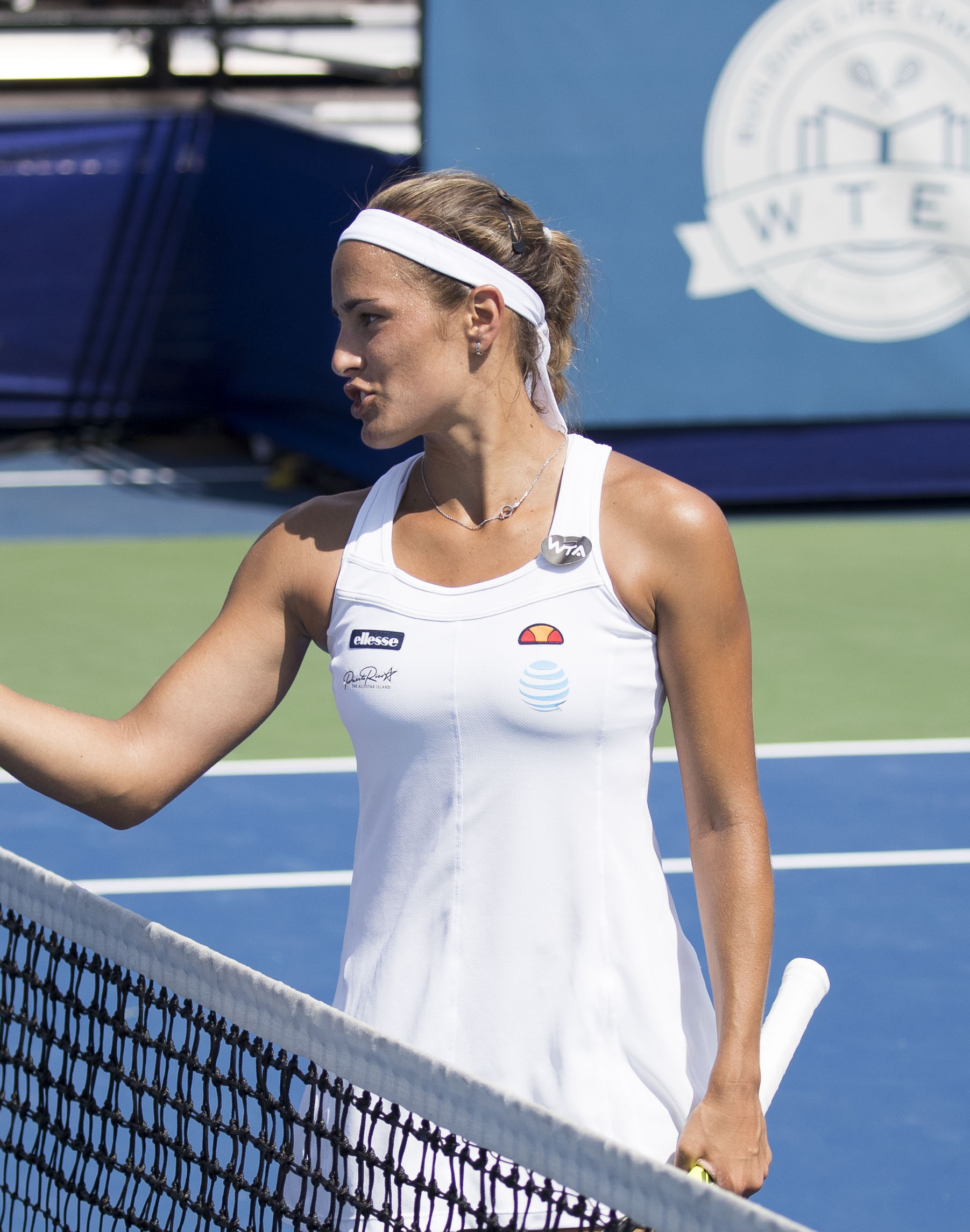
Monica Puig – Olympic gold medalist

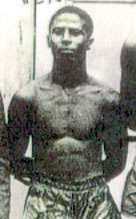
Juan Evangelista Venegas – Olympic medalist

=== A ===
- Benjamin Agosto, figure skater and Olympic medalist (Puerto Rican father)
- Roberto Alomar, baseball player, MLB All-Star, third Puerto Rican inducted to the Baseball Hall of Fame (2011)
- Sandy Alomar Jr., baseball player
- Sandy Alomar Sr., baseball player
- Carmelo Anthony, NBA player, Los Angeles Lakers (Puerto Rican father)
- Orlando Antigua, in 1995, the first Hispanic and first non-black in 52 years to play for the Harlem Globetrotters (Puerto Rican mother)
- Chris Armas, soccer player (Puerto Rican mother)
- Carlos Arroyo (born 1979), former NBA player, member and captain of the Puerto Rican national basketball team
- Harry Arroyo, boxer, former IBF Lightweight Champion
- Nolan Arenado, baseball player, Colorado Rockies (Puerto Rican mother)
- Jake Arrieta, baseball player, Chicago Cubs (Puerto Rican grandfather)

=== B ===
- Javier Báez, baseball player, Detroit Tigers World Series champion 2016 Chicago Cubs
- Juan Báez, former basketball player; recipient of Puerto Rico Olympic Medal of Honor
- J. J. Barea, NBA player, Dallas Mavericks; first Puerto Rican to play for winning team in the NBA Finals
- María Elena Batista, Olympic, PanAm and Central American games swimmer
- Bayley, WWE wrestler, real name Pamela Rose Martinez
- Eddie Belmonte, thoroughbred racing jockey
- Carlos Beltrán, baseball player, outfielder/designated hitter, Texas Rangers
- Wilfred Benítez, boxer, member of the International Boxing Hall of Fame
- David "Kike" Bernier, retired fencer, former Secretary of Sports and Recreation
- Hiram Bithorn, baseball player, first Puerto Rican in Major League Baseball
- Liston Bochette, Olympian and politician
- Kristina Brandi, tennis player
- Isabel Bustamante, Paralympic athlete, first gold medalist for Puerto Rico at a Paralympic or Olympic games competition, gold at the 1988 Women's shot put 1B paralympic competition

=== C ===
- Iván Calderón, baseball player
- Iván Calderón, boxer, world champion
- Hector 'Macho' Camacho, boxer, former world champion and member of the International Boxing Hall of Fame
- Jasmine Camacho-Quinn, hurdles, won Puerto Rico's second Olympic gold medal in the Women's 100m Hurdles in the Olympic games which were celebrated in Tokyo, Japan.
- Rafael Campos, professional golfer known for his achievements on the PGA Tour
- Fernando J. Canales, swimmer, first Puerto Rican to reach final championships
- Pedro Miguel Caratini, baseball player; born in Puerto Rico, "the father of Dominican baseball"
- Orlando Cepeda, baseball player, member of Baseball Hall of Fame
- Pedro Anibal Cepeda, a.k.a. "Perucho" and "The Bull", baseball player; father of Orlando Cepeda; known as "the Babe Ruth of Puerto Rico"
- Nero Chen, Puerto Rico's first professional boxer
- Julie Chu, Olympic ice hockey player; forward on the U.S. women's ice hockey team; of Chinese and Puerto Rican descent
- Alex Cintrón, former professional baseball infielder and current hitting coach for the Houston Astros of Major League Baseball
- Conchita Cintrón, bullfighter (Puerto Rican father)
- Kermit Cintrón, boxer, former International Boxing Federation welterweight champion (2006–08)
- Roberto Clemente, 3,000-hit baseball player, first Puerto Rican member of Baseball Hall of Fame
- Rebekah Colberg, known as "the mother of Puerto Rican women's sports"; participated in various athletic competitions in the 1938 Central American and Caribbean Games in Panama, where she won gold medals in discus and javelin throw
- Carlitos Colon, former professional wrestler and member of the WWE Hall of Fame
- Carlito Colón, professional wrestler
- Primo Colón, professional wrestler
- Alex Cora, became the first Puerto Rican to manage a World Series winning team when the Boston Red Sox defeated the LA Dodgers in 2018.
- Ángel Cordero Jr., jockey, member of Jockey Hall of Fame
- Carlos Correa, first pick of the 2012 MLB Draft; 2015 AL Rookie of the Year
- Maritza Correia, first Afro-Puerto Rican female on the U.S. Olympic swimming team
- Joe Cortez, boxing referee; member of the International Boxing Hall of Fame
- Carla Cortijo, basketball player, first Puerto Rican-born woman to play in the WNBA; guard for the Atlanta Dream
- Miguel Cotto, professional boxer, former light welterweight, welterweight and junior middleweight world champion
- Eva Cruz, volleyball player
- José "Cheo" Cruz, baseball player whose number was retired by the Astros
- Orlando Cruz, boxer; first professional boxer to publicly announce he is gay
- Teófilo Cruz, basketball player
- Victor Cruz, NFL football player
- Javier Culson, Olympic athlete; bronze medalist; specialises in the 400 metre hurdles

=== D ===
- Christian Dalmau, BSN basketball player
- Raymond Dalmau, basketball player
- Carlos De León, first boxer to win cruiserweight world title four times
- Esteban De Jesús, boxer, former world champion
- Madeline de Jesús, athlete, runner short track, long-jump, triple jump, gold, silver and bronze medallist, participant in two Olympic Games
- Carlos Delgado, baseball player, New York Mets
- Edwin Díaz, baseball player, Seattle Mariners; by reaching his 50th strikeout in only 25 and a third innings, Díaz became the first pitcher to do so in at least 123 years

=== E ===
- Ivelisse Echevarría, inducted into the International Softball Federation Hall of Fame (2003)
- Alfredo Escalera, boxer, former world champion
- Alfredo L. Escalera, baseball player, youngest player ever drafted by an MLB organization; drafted in 2012 by the Kansas City Royals franchise
- Nino Escalera, baseball player, first Hispanic in the Cincinnati Reds franchise
- Sixto Escobar, boxer, first Puerto Rican world champion and member of the International Boxing Hall of Fame
- Ángel Espada, boxer, former champion

=== F ===
- Gigi Fernández, tennis player, in 1992 became the first female athlete from her native Puerto Rico win an Olympic gold medal; first female athlete from Puerto Rico to turn professional; first Puerto Rican woman inducted into the International Tennis Hall of Fame
- Lisa Fernandez, softball player, Olympic gold medalist (Puerto Rican mother)
- Orlando Fernández, a.k.a. "the Puerto Rican Aquaman"; swimmer; first Puerto Rican to swim across the Strait of Gibraltar
- Ed Figueroa, baseball pitcher, first Puerto Rican to win 20 games in Major League
- Enrique Figueroa, sailing

=== G ===
- Rubén Gómez, first Puerto Rican to pitch and win a World Series game
- Wilfredo Gómez, boxer, former world champion; member of the International Boxing Hall of Fame
- Arístides González, boxer, first Olympic medalist under the flag of Puerto Rico, 1984 Summer Olympics
- Jorge González, marathon runner
- Juan González, baseball player

=== H ===
- Herbert Lewis Hardwick, a.k.a. "Cocoa Kid", boxer, inducted into the International Boxing Hall of Fame in 2012
- Ivonne Harrison, track and field athlete
- Von Hayes, former professional baseball player whose Major League Baseball (MLB) career spanned from 1981 to 1992 for the Cleveland Indians, Philadelphia Phillies, and California Angels.
- Aaron Hernandez, NFL football player and former member of the New England Patriots
- Enrique Hernandez, baseball player, known colloquially as "Kiké"
- James Chico Hernandez, wrestling champion and member of the Latin-American Martial Arts Hall of Fame
- Laurie Hernandez, Olympic gold and silver medalist; member of the United States women's gymnastics team
- Ramón Hernández, baseball player

=== J ===
- Reggie Jackson, baseball player, member of Baseball Hall of Fame (Puerto Rican father)

=== K ===
- Julio Kaplan, chess International Master; former World Junior Chess Champion
- Konnan, professional wrestler
- Karrion Kross, professional wrestler, previously known as Killer Kross, real name Kevin Kesar

=== L ===
- Anita Lallande, former Olympic swimmer; holds the island record for most medals won at CAC Games: 17 and 10 gold
- AJ Lee, WWE Divas Champion, real name April Mendez
- Alfred Lee, basketball player; first Puerto Rican to play in NBA and to play on the NBA play-offs as a member of the 79-80 Los Angeles Lakers
- Angelita Lind, track and field athlete
- Francisco Lindor, baseball player, New York Mets
- Laura Daniela Lloreda, member of the Mexican national volleyball team
- Javy López, baseball player, Atlanta Braves
- Mike Lowell, baseball player, Boston Red Sox

=== M ===
- Felix Magath, German soccer star and coach (Puerto Rican father)
- Martín Maldonado, Major League Baseball catcher and Gold Glove Award winner
- Mario Rivera Martino, Boxing sports writer and eventual commissioner. Member of the International Boxing Hall of Fame
- Edgar Martínez, former Major League Baseball player and fifth Puerto Rican member of Baseball Hall of Fame
- Denise Masino, bodybuilder
- Mark Medal, boxer, former IBF Light Middleweight Champion
- Orlando Melendez, a.k.a. "El Gato", in 2008, became the first Puerto Rican-born basketball player to play for the Harlem Globetrotters
- Alberto Mercado, Olympian boxer
- Jerome Mincy, basketball player
- Bengie Molina, Major League Baseball catcher and Rawlings Gold Glove Award winner
- John John Molina, boxer, former world champion
- José Molina, Major League Baseball catcher
- Yadier Molina, Major League Baseball catcher, All-Star, and Rawlings Gold Glove Award winner
- David Monasterio, swimmer, member of the 1992 Olympic team for Puerto Rico
- Pedro Montañez, boxer and member of the International Boxing Hall of Fame
- Mario Morales, BSN basketball player
- Pedro Morales, wrestler, member of WWE Hall of Fame
- Jonny Moseley, skier, first Puerto Rican member of the U.S. ski team

=== N ===
- Emilio Navarro, first Puerto Rican to play in the Negro leagues

=== O ===
- Tai Odiase, 2018, American and naturalized Puerto Rican player for Hapoel Tel Aviv of the Israeli Israeli Basketball Premier League
- Luis Olmo, first Puerto Rican to hit a home run in the World Series
- Fres Oquendo, professional boxer
- John Orozco, Olympic gymnast
- Carlos Ortiz, boxer, former, junior welterweight and lightweight champion; member of the International Boxing Hall of Fame
- José Ortiz, former basketball player, PDP candidate for elective office in 2008
- Luis Ortiz, boxer, first Puerto Rican to win a silver Olympic medal

=== P ===
- Isiah Pacheco, Kansas City Chiefs running back
- Raúl Papaleo, member of Puerto Rican national volleyball team
- Charlie Pasarell, tennis player
- Ernesto Pastor, bullfighter, only Puerto Rican member of the Bullfighting Hall of Fame
- Victor Pellot, a.k.a. "Vic Power", baseball player, second Afro-Puerto Rican in Major League Baseball
- Anthony "Tony" Perez, boxing referee and judge.
- Jorge Posada, baseball player, New York Yankees
- Damian Priest, WWE wrestler, real name Luis Martinez (Born in New York City to Puerto Rican parents, raised in Dorado, Puerto Rico)
- Monica Puig, tennis player; in the 2016 Olympics in Rio de Janeiro, won Puerto Rico's first-ever Olympic gold medal

=== Q ===
- Carlos Quintana, professional boxer, former World Boxing Organization's welterweight champion

=== R ===
- Peter John Ramos, former NBA and international basketball player
- Rico Ramos, professional boxer
- Héctor Ramos, professional football player, Puerto Rico national football team captain and top scorer
- Heliot Ramos, baseball center fielder for the San Francisco Giants
- Germán Rieckehoff, former president of Puerto Rican Olympic Committee
- Alex Ríos, is an American former professional baseball right fielder.
- Eddie Rios Mellado, inventor of basketball's three-point-line
- Ramón Rivas, NBA and international basketball player
- Antonio Rivera, boxer, a.k.a. "El Gallo"; WBA Super Welterweight Champion
- Filiberto Rivera, former UTEP star point guard and former point guard on Puerto Rico national basketball team
- Jorge Rivera, mixed martial artist
- Neftalí Rivera, basketball player, record holder for most points scored in a game in the Baloncesto Superior Nacional league with 79 points.
- Marco Rivera, NFL football player, first Puerto Rican selected to Pro Bowl
- Ron Rivera, NFL football player, first Puerto Rican in the National Football League and to coach an NFL team
- Iván Rodríguez, former baseball player for the Texas Rangers. Inducted into the National Baseball Hall of Fame in 2017
- Rubén Rodríguez, basketball player
- José Roman, boxer, first Puerto Rican to fight for the world heavyweight title
- Francisco Rosa Rivera, "the trainer of stars"; personal trainer and self-made bodybuilding entrepreneur
- Edwin Rosario, boxer, former lightweight and junior welterweight champion; member of the International Boxing Hall of Fame (2006)
- Juan "Chi-Chi" Rodríguez, golfer, member of Golf Hall of Fame
- John Ruiz, a.k.a. "The Quietman", first Hispanic to become the heavyweight boxing champion of the world

=== S ===
- Natasha Sagardia, bodyboarding athlete; first Puerto Rican to win a gold medal at the ISA World Surfing Games
- Alex Sánchez, a.k.a. "El Nene Sanchez", boxer, former champion
- Rey Sanchez, baseball player
- Mike Santana, a.k.a Cruz Montana, WWE professional wrestler, real name Mark Anthony Sanchez (Born & Raised in New York, Puerto Rican descent)
- Benito Santiago, former MLB 1987 Rookie of the Year
- Daniel Santiago, former NBA basketball player
- O. J. Santiago, NFL player
- Amanda Serrano, Puerto Rican professional boxer and mixed martial artist
- Samuel Serrano, boxer, former world champion
- Jessica Steffens, U.S. Olympic 2012 gold medal winner (Puerto Rican father)
- Margaret "Maggie" Steffens, U.S. Olympic 2012 gold medal winner; sister of Jessica Steffens

=== T ===
- Julio Toro, basketball coach
- Andrés Torres, baseball player, San Francisco Giants
- Georgie Torres, holds BSN scoring record
- José Torres, boxer, member of the International Boxing Hall of Fame
- Thea Trinidad, Former WWE wrestler, used to be known as Zelina Vega. (Puerto Rican descent)
- Félix "Tito" Trinidad, boxer, former world champion. Member of the International Boxing Hall of Fame

=== V ===
- Lisa Marie Varon, WWE wrestler
- Jesse Vassallo, swimmer; current president of PR Swimming Federation; member of the International Swimming Hall of Fame
- Javier Vázquez, baseball player, active leader in strikeouts
- Wilfredo Vázquez, boxer, former champion
- Savio Vega, former WWF wrestler
- John Velazquez, jockey, member of Jockey Hall of Fame
- Ada Vélez, first Puerto Rican female boxer to win a championship
- Juan Evangelista Venegas, boxer; first Puerto Rican to win an Olympic medal
- Dick Versace, first person of Puerto Rican descent to coach an NBA team
- Juan "Pachín" Vicéns, basketball player, led the Ponce Lions team to six championships

=== W ===
- Mark Watring, equestrian
- Bernie Williams, baseball player, New York Yankees
- Mary Pat Wilson, Puerto Rico's first and only female Olympic skier; only woman in the Puerto Rican Ski Team in the 1988 Winter Olympics

== Taínos ==
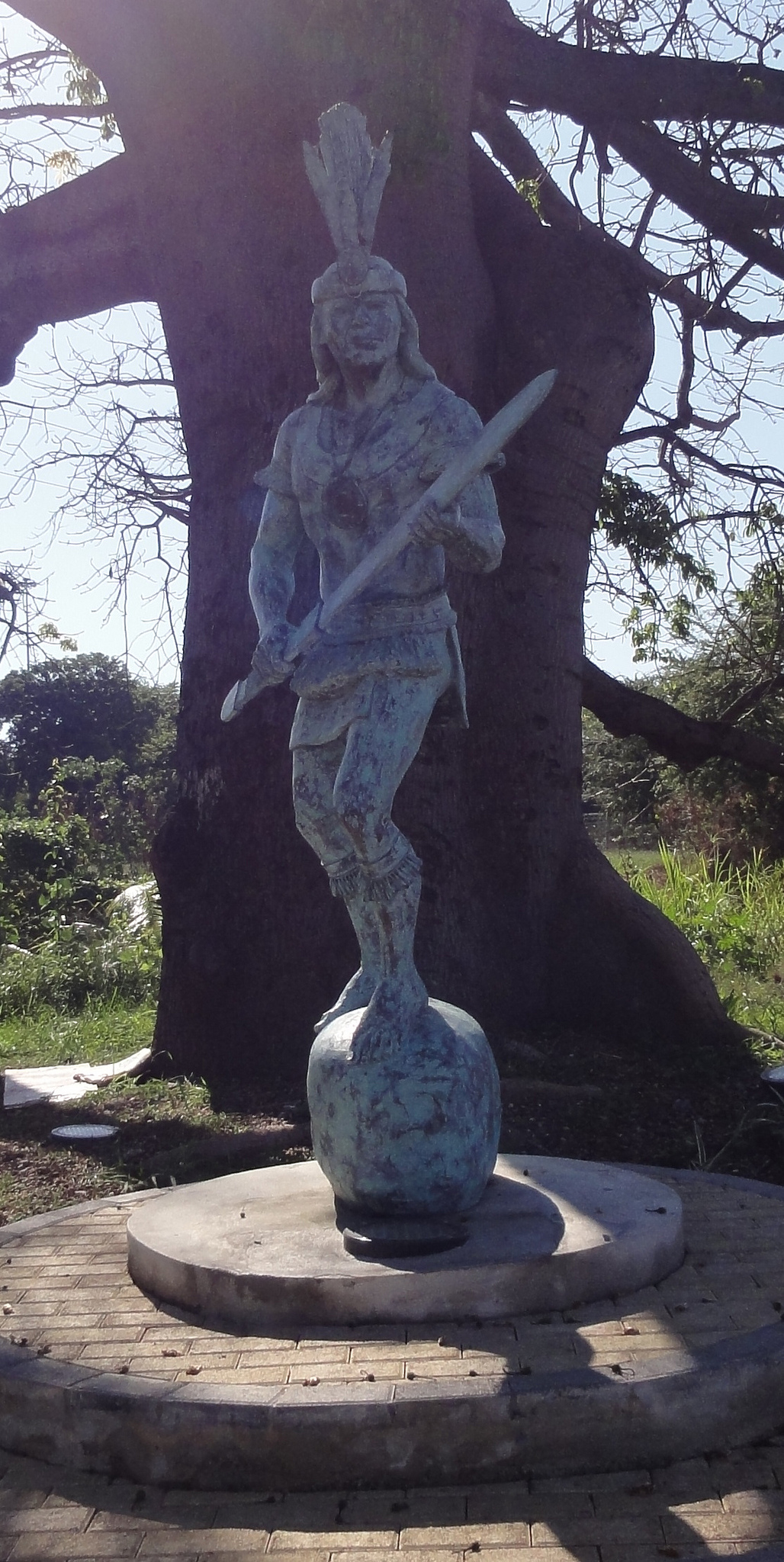
Agüeybaná II (The Brave)

- Agüeybaná (Great Sun), Supreme Taíno chief, Supreme Cacique of Puerto Rico who welcomed Juan Ponce de León to the island; based in Guayanilla
- Agüeybaná II (The Brave), cacique and brother of Agueybaná; led the Taíno rebellion of 1511 against Juan Ponce de León and his men; based in Guayanilla
- Arasibo, cacique, area of Arecibo
- Caguax, cacique, area of Caguas
- Guarionex, cacique, area of Utuado
- Hayuya, cacique, area of Jayuya
- Jumacao, cacique, area of Humacao
- Orocobix, cacique, area of Orocovis
- Urayoán, cacique, area that presently spans between Añasco and Mayagüez; ordered the drowning of Diego Salcedo

== Visual artists ==
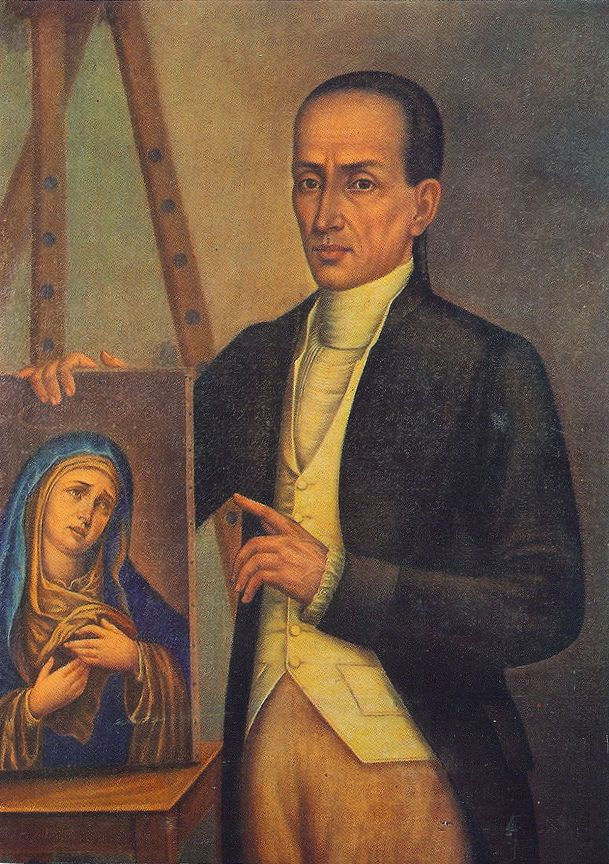
José Campeche

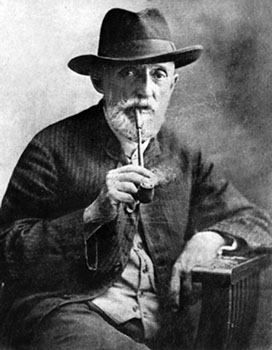
Francisco Oller

- Alfonso Arana, painter, founder of the Fundación Alfonso Arana
- Imna Arroyo, artist
- Myrna Báez, painter and printmaker
- Jean-Michel Basquiat, painter (Puerto Rican mother)
- Tomás Batista, sculptor of "El Jibaro Puertorriqueño" monument and Zeno Gandía statue
- Isabel Bernal, painter from San Sebastián
- Ángel Botello, painter and sculptor
- Antonio Broccoli Porto, painter and sculptor from San Juan
- José Buscaglia Guillermety, sculptor
- Luis Germán Cajiga, painter most known for his silk screening technique
- Javier Cambre, sculptor, photographer, video artist
- José Campeche, artist
- José Caraballo, artist; President of Hispanic Art League, 1979
- Sofía Córdova, Puerto Rican mixed media artist
- Lindsay Daen, New Zealand-born artist; sculptor of La Rogativa statue in San Juan
- Jan D'Esopo, painter and sculptor
- Elizam Escobar, painter and activist
- James De La Vega, mural artist
- Ramón Frade, artist and architect
- Obed Gómez, contemporary artist known as the "Puerto Rican Picasso"
- Vilma G. Holland, painter
- Lorenzo Homar, graphic artist
- Antonio López, fashion illustrator
- Teresa López (born 1957), artist, graphic designer and art professor
- Daniel Lind-Ramos (born 1953), conceptual sculptor and painter
- Roberto Lugo, Visual Artist,
- Soraida Martinez, contemporary painter known for creating socially conscious Verdadism art since 1992
- Antonio Martorell, painter and graphic artist
- Ralph Ortiz, visual artist and founder of the El Museo del Barrio
- Francisco Oller, impressionist artist and painter
- María de Mater O'Neill, painter, educator, and graphic artist
- María Luisa Penne, painter, educator, and graphic artist
- Manuel Rivera-Ortiz, photographer
- Arnaldo Roche Rabell (1955–2018), painter
- Angel Rodriguez-Diaz (1955–2023), painter and sculptor
- Julio Rosado del Valle, internationally known abstract expressionist
- Esteban Soriano, cartoonist, caricaturist, painter, ceramist, tile painter (1900-1969)
- Samuel E Vázquez, abstract expressionist painter
- Miriam Zamparelli, sculptor

== Miscellaneous ==
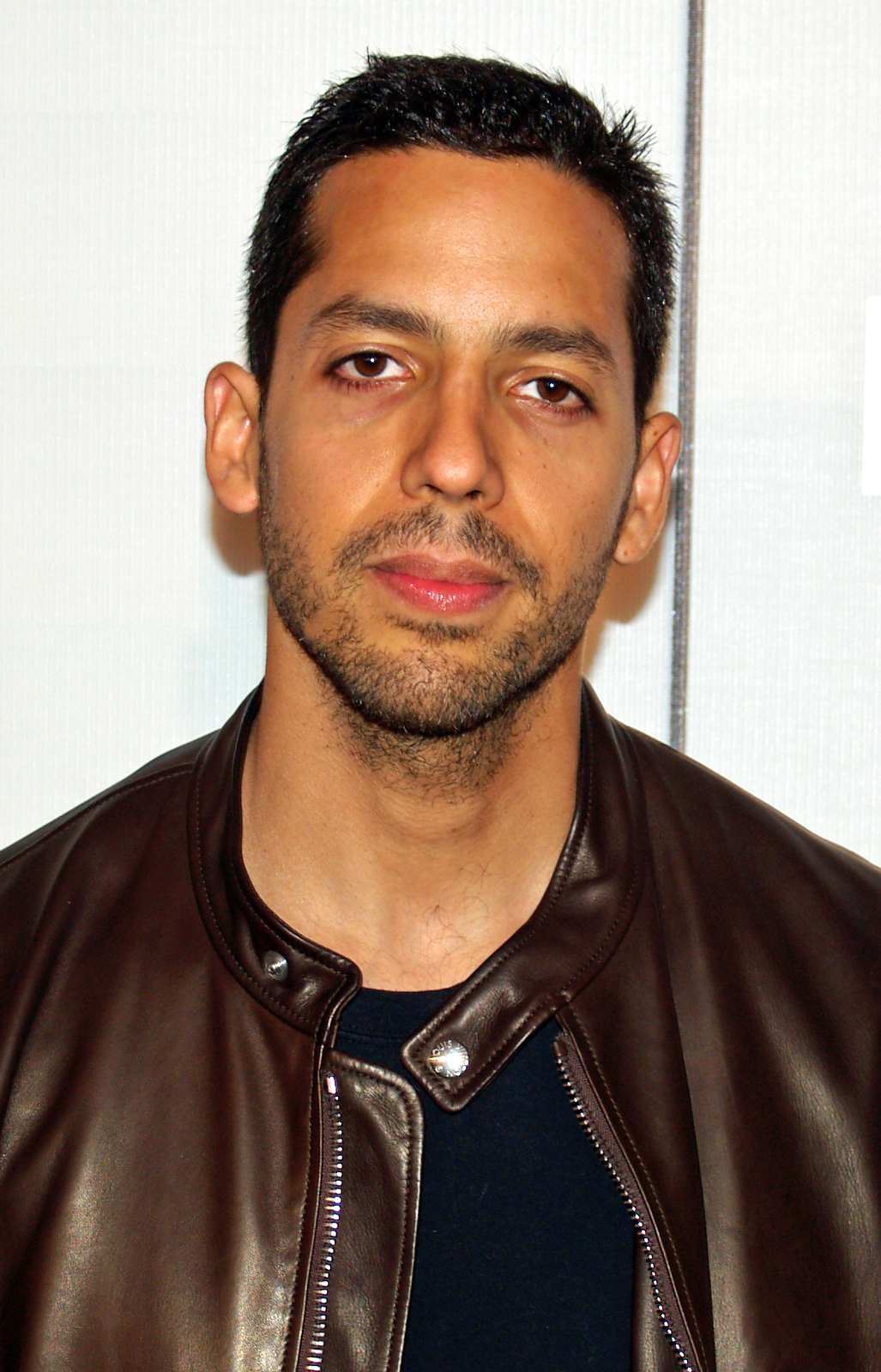
David Blaine

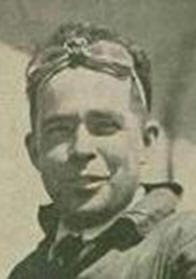
Félix Rigau Carrera

- Reynold Alexander, illusionist, magician
- Carmen Rivera de Alvarado (1910–1973), social worker, educator and activist
- Arthur Aviles, dancer and choreographer
- Jose Baez, criminal defense attorney; notable for his defense of accused child murderer Casey Anthony
- Orlando Bravo, first self-made billionaire from Puerto Rico
- Marie Haydée Beltrán Torres, nationalist, convicted for a bombing in Manhattan
- Felipe Birriel, "El Gigante de Carolina", the tallest Puerto Rican
- David Blaine, illusionist, magician (Puerto Rican father)
- Miguel de Buría, slave, known as King Miguel I de Buría
- Desiree Casado (born 1985), former actress
- Elisa Colberg, founder of the Puerto Rican Girl Scouts
- Inez García, cause celebre of the feminist movement
- Juan Manuel García Passalacqua, political commentator, lawyer
- Félix Rigau Carrera, first Puerto Rican pilot; first pilot to fly on air mail carrying duties in Puerto Rico
- Crazy Legs, breakdancer, president of Rock Steady Crew
- Clara Livingston, Puerto Rico's first female aviator
- Agustina Luvis Núñez (born 1959), theologian and writer
- Salixto Medina, lawyer, assistant U.S. attorney
- Emiliano Mercado del Toro, World's oldest living person from December 11, 2006 – January 24, 2007; oldest verified military veteran and Puerto Rican ever
- Filiberto Ojeda Ríos, commander in chief ("Responsible General") of the Boricua Popular Army
- Richard Peña, organizer of New York Film Festival; professor of film studies at Columbia University
- Tina Ramirez, dancer and choreographer born in Venezuela, best known as the Founder and Artistic Director of Ballet Hispanico of New York
- Gabriela Rose Reagan (born 1988), former actress, and daughter of Sonia Manzano
- José Rodríguez, head of CIA division (2004–2008)
- Antulio "Kobbo" Santarrosa, "La Cháchara", "La Condesa", "La Comay"
- Jock Soto, principal ballet dancer with the New York City Ballet
- Filipo Tirado, puppeteer
- Carlos Alberto Torres, nationalist and former political prisoner
- Teodoro Vidal, government official, art historian, and folklorist who collected Puerto Rican art
- Elizabeth Yeampierre, attorney and environmental activist

== Gallery ==
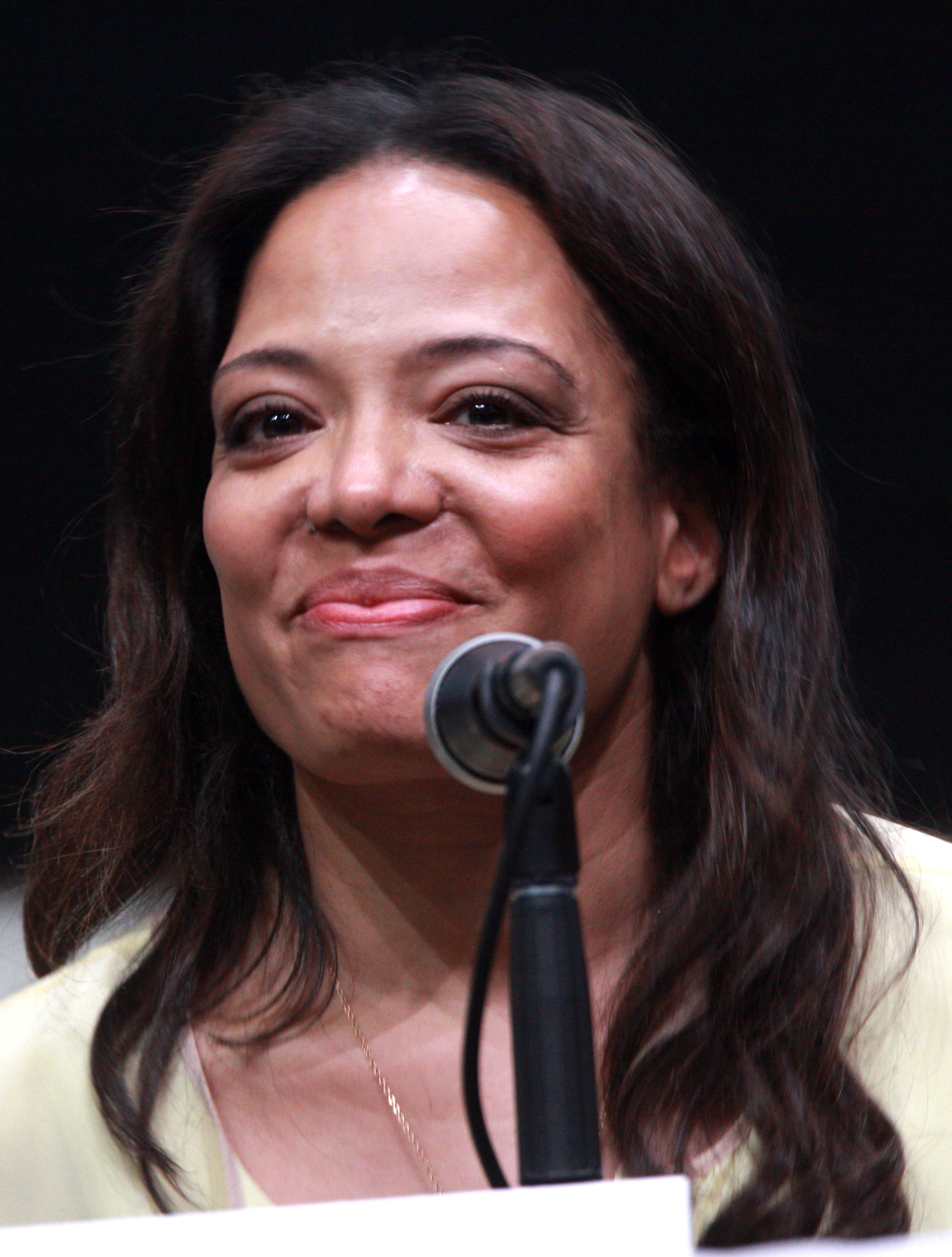
Lauren Velez

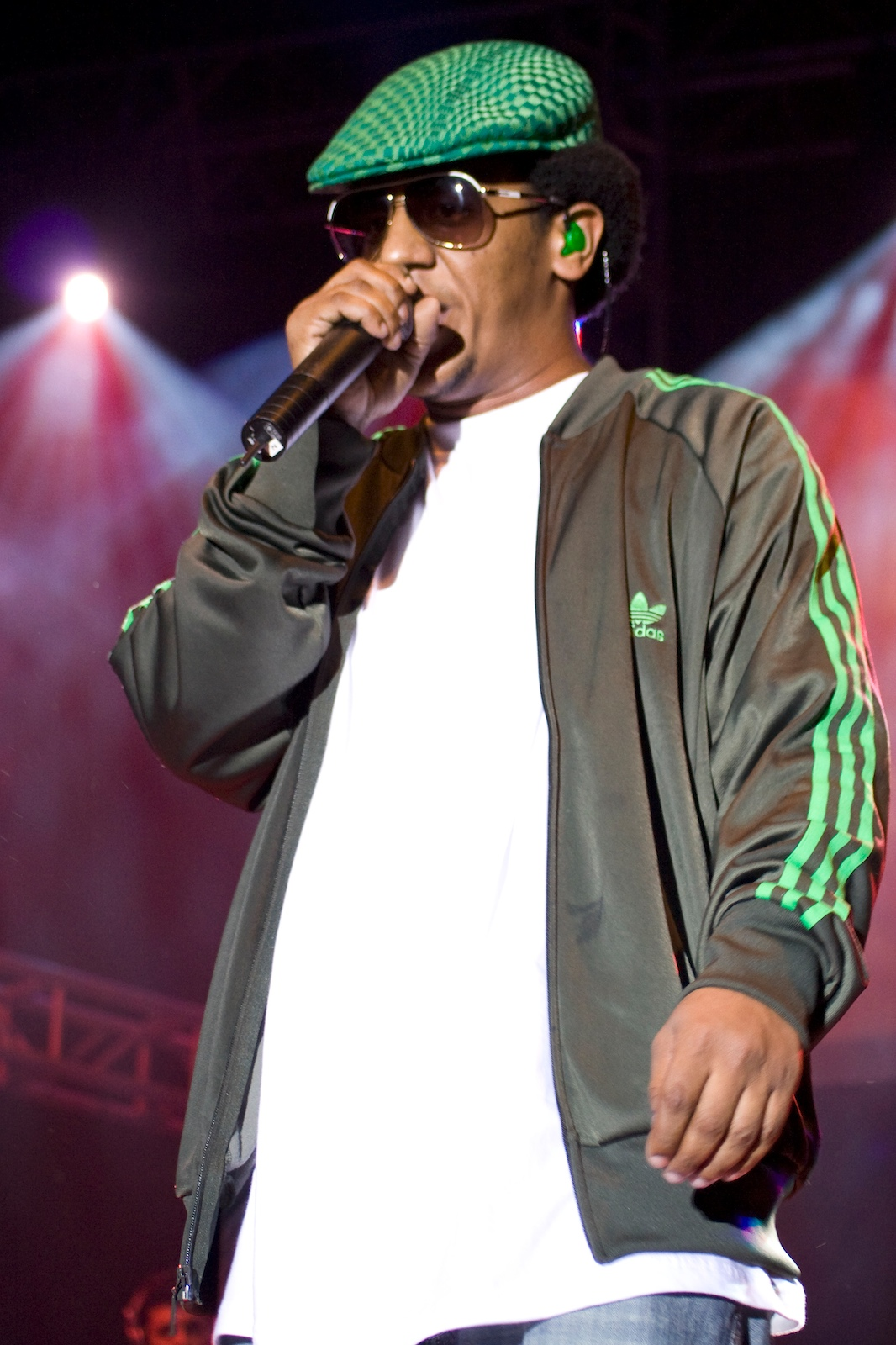
Tego Calderón

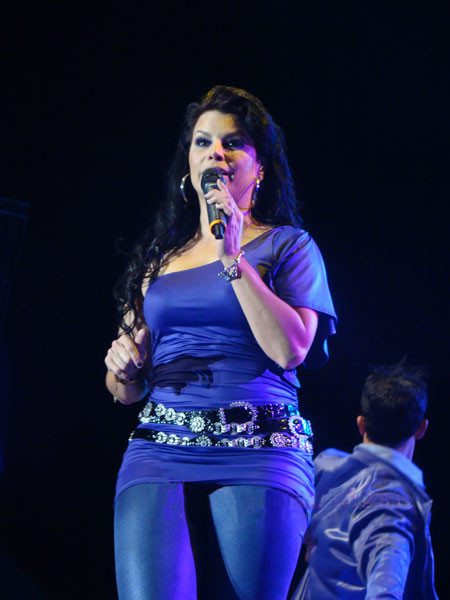
Olga Tañón

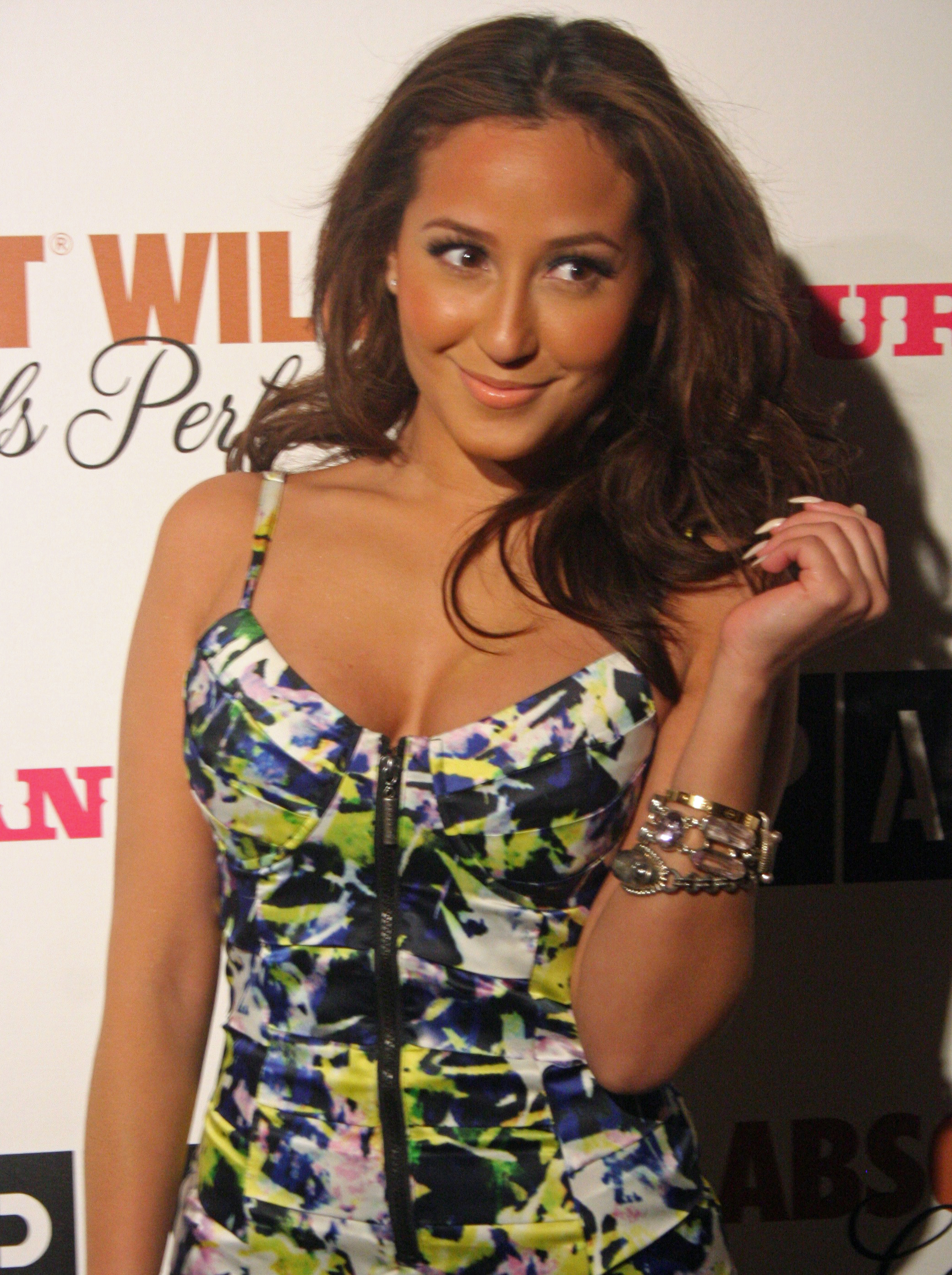
Adrienne Bailon

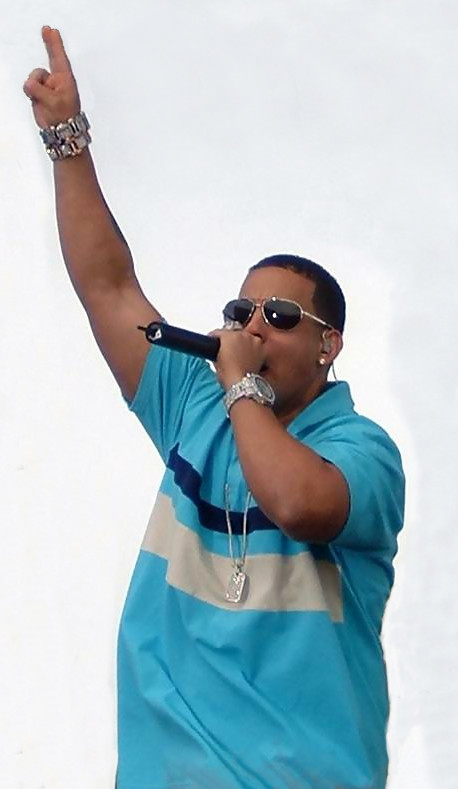
Daddy Yankee

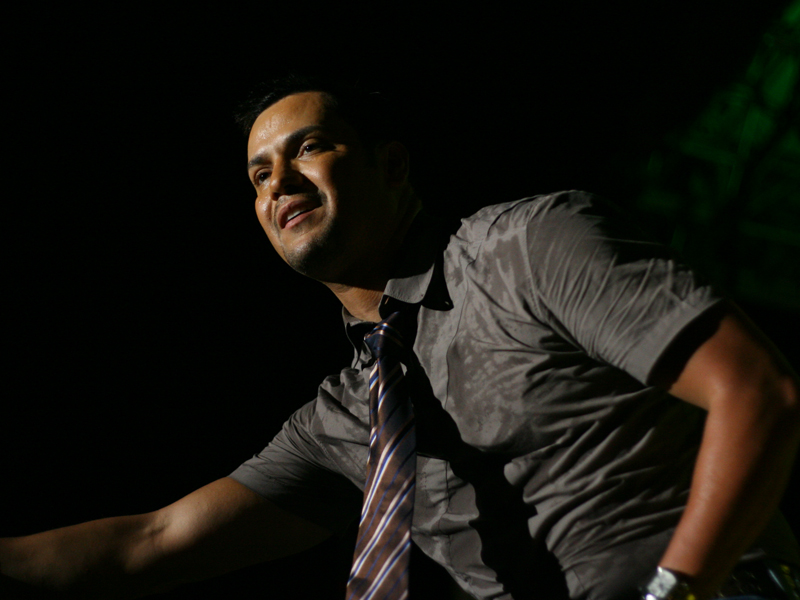
Victor Manuelle

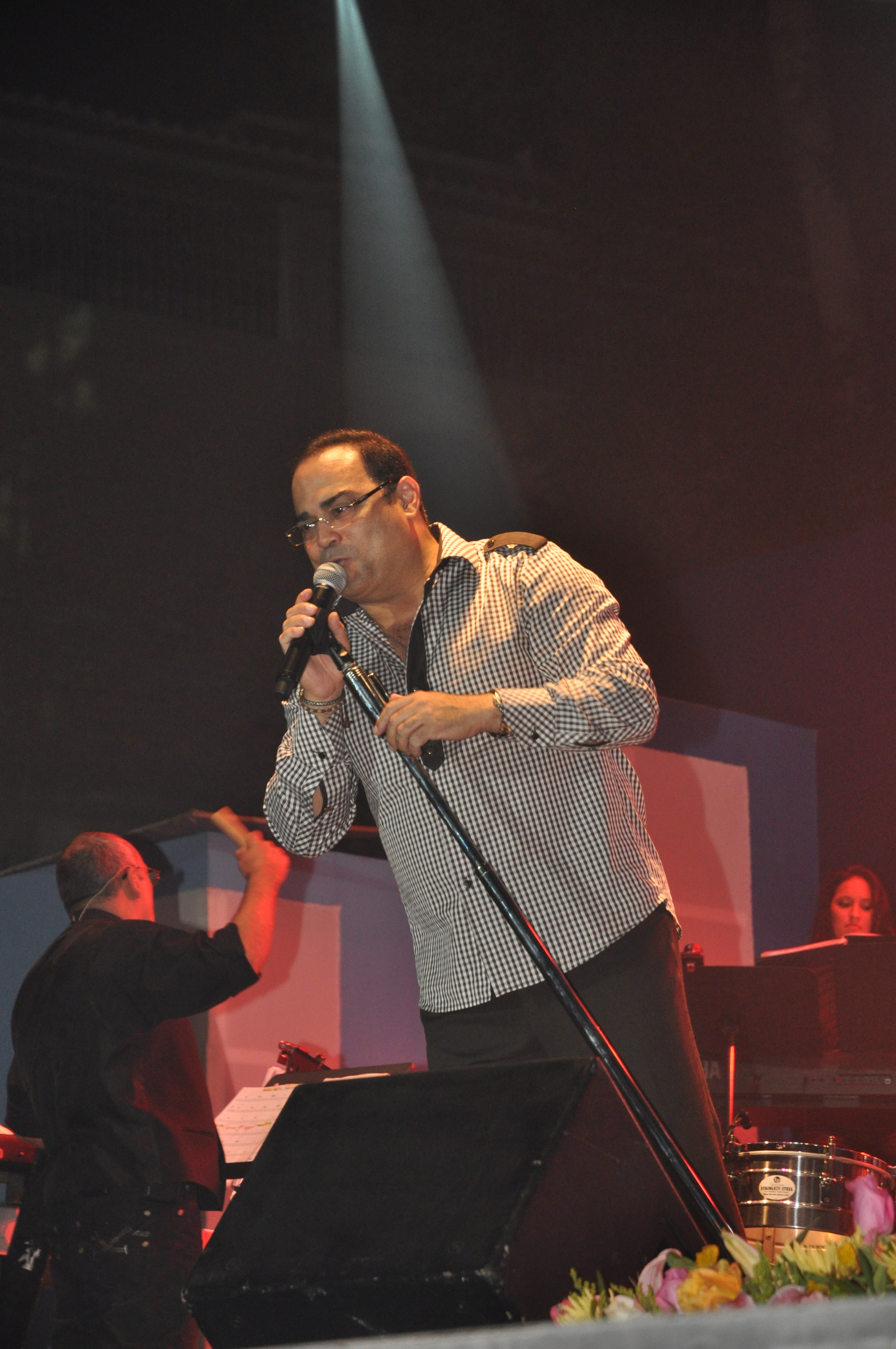
Gilberto Santa Rosa

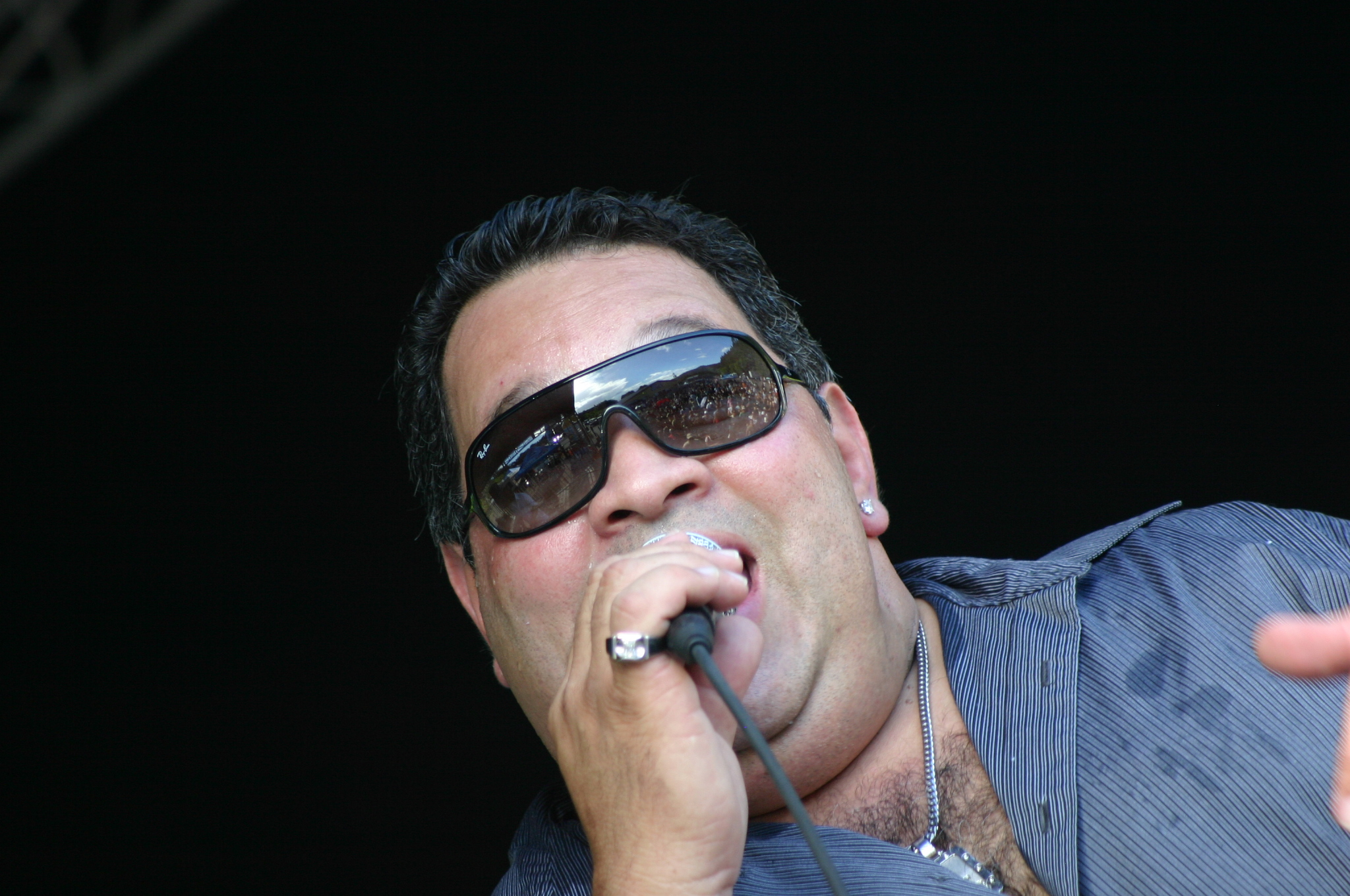
Tito Nieves

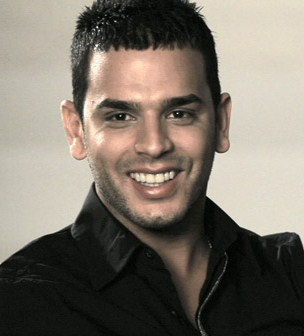
Tito el Bambino

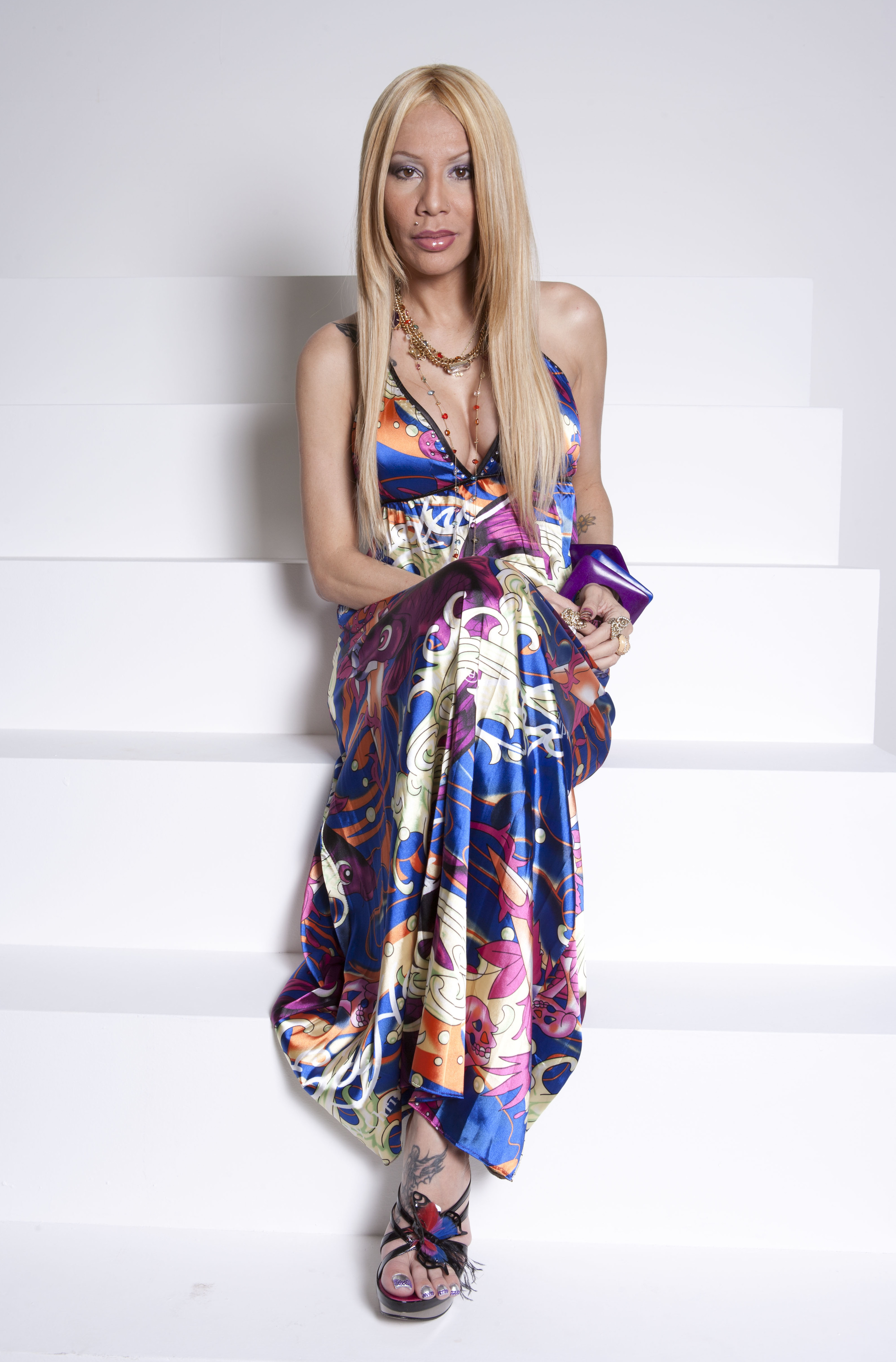
Ivy Queen

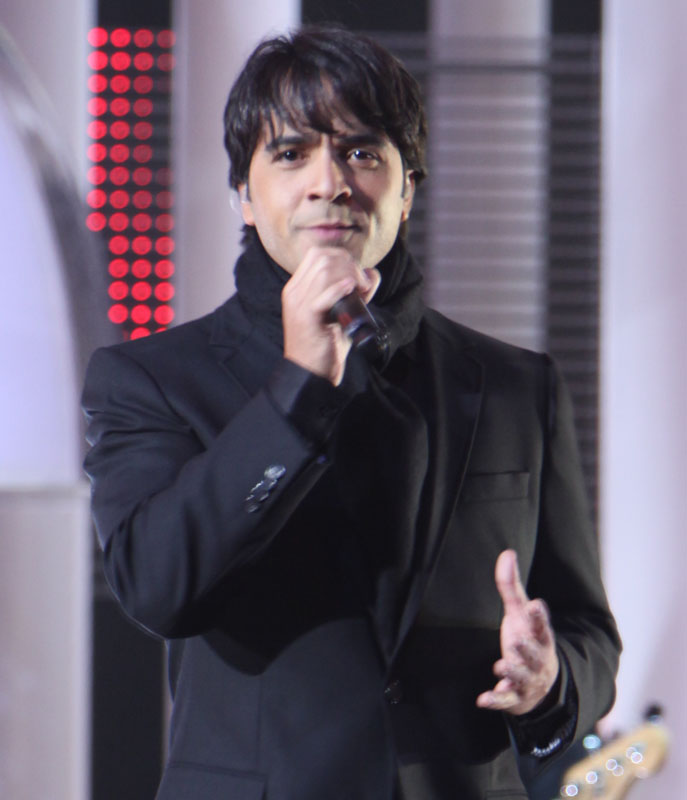
Luis Fonsi

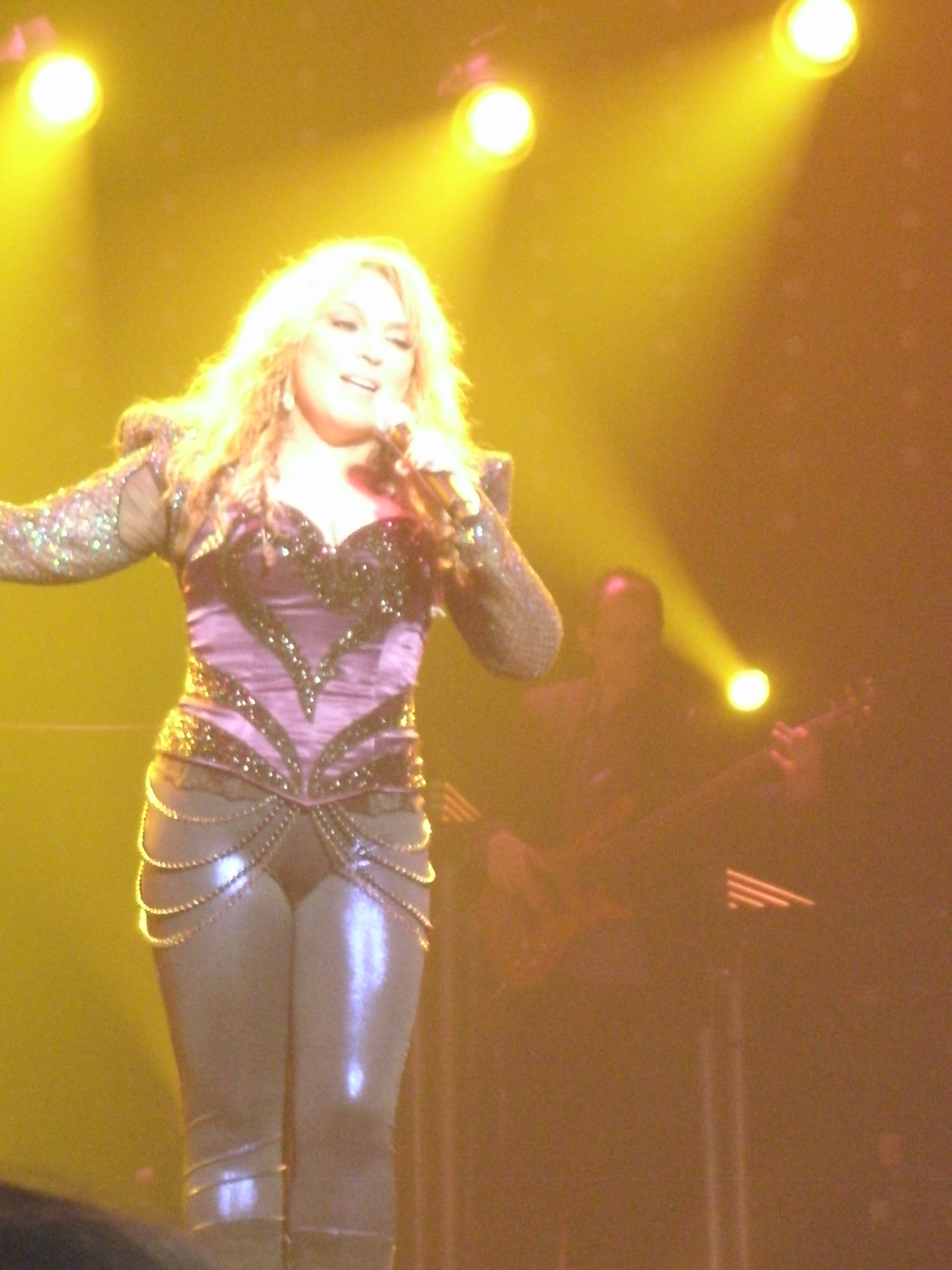
Ednita Nazario

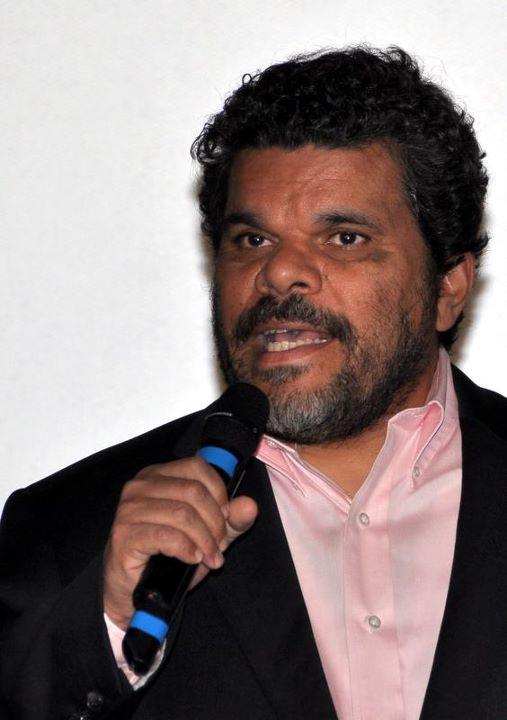
Luis Guzmán

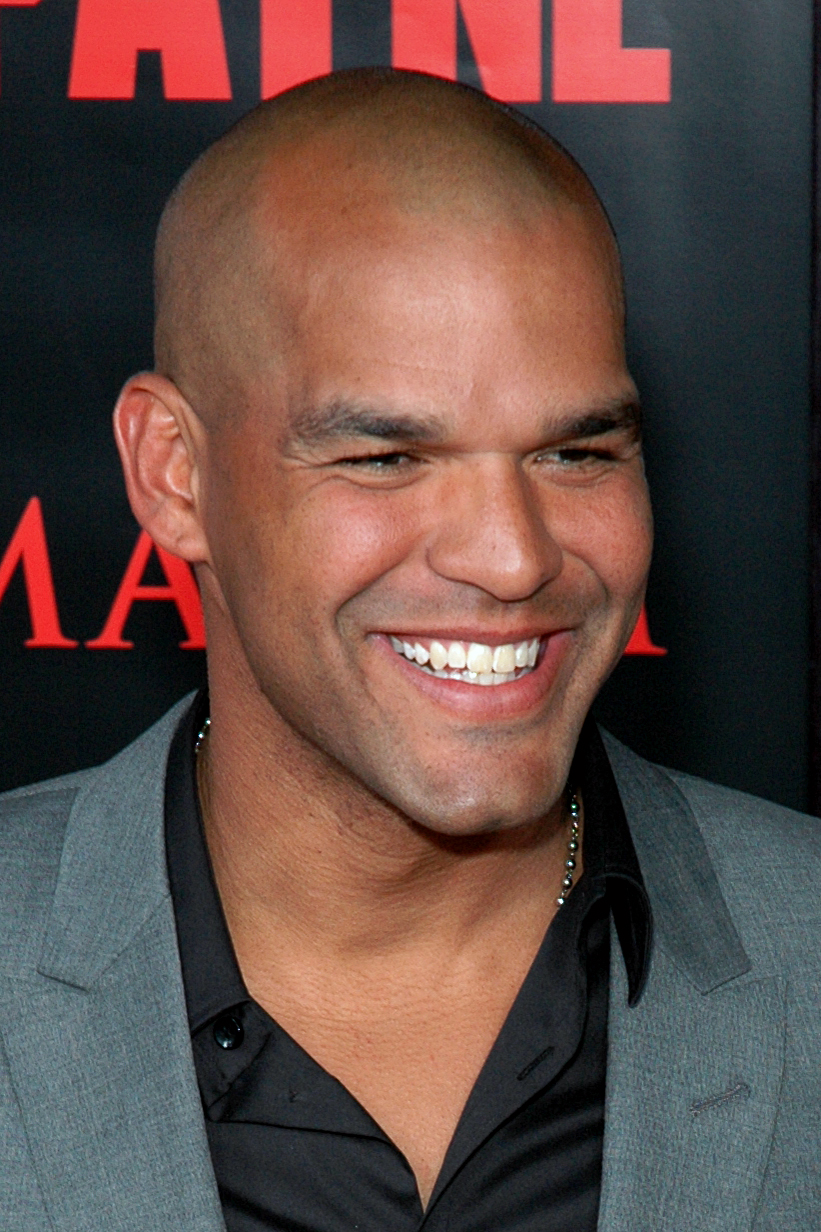
Amaury Nolasco

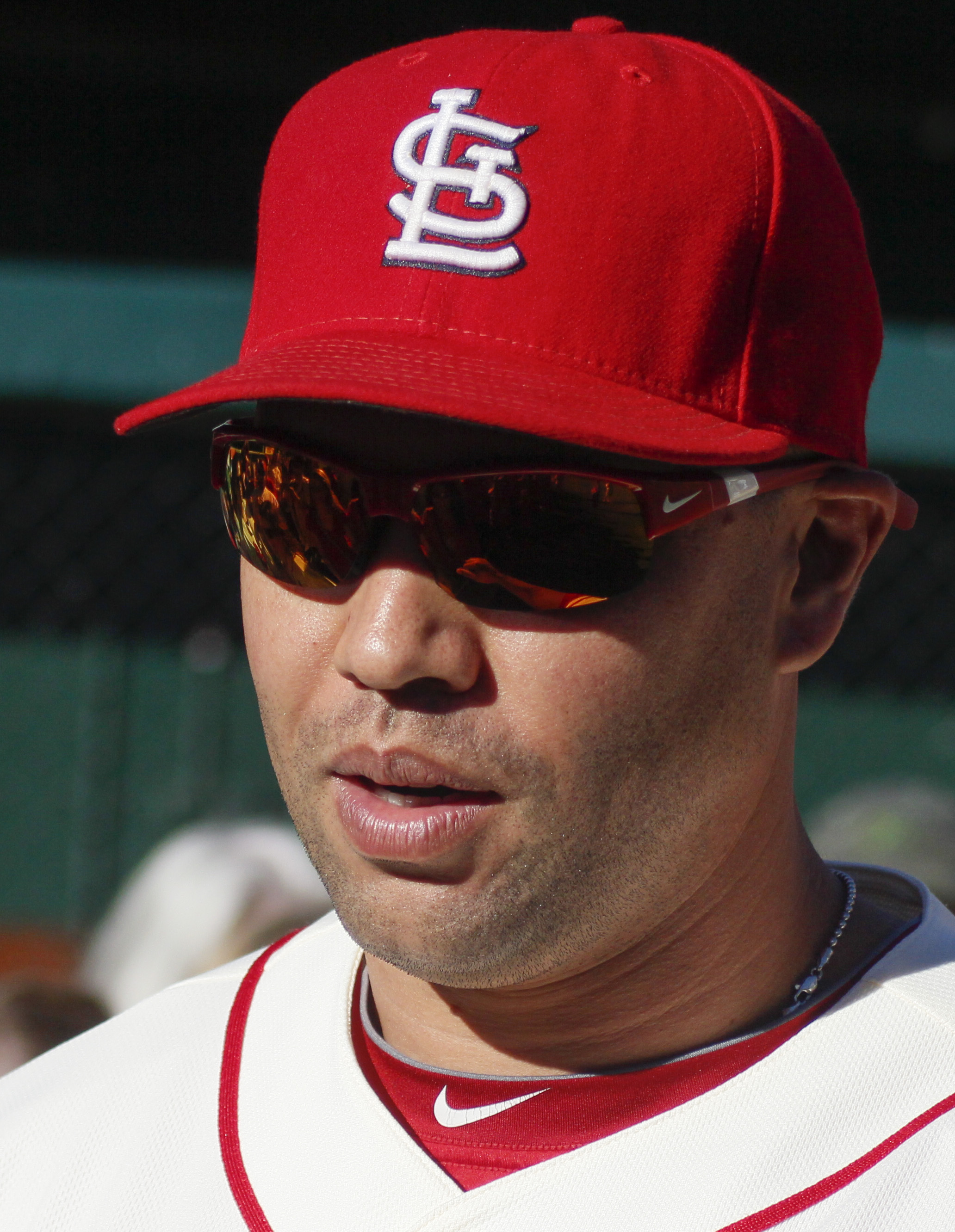
Carlos Beltrán

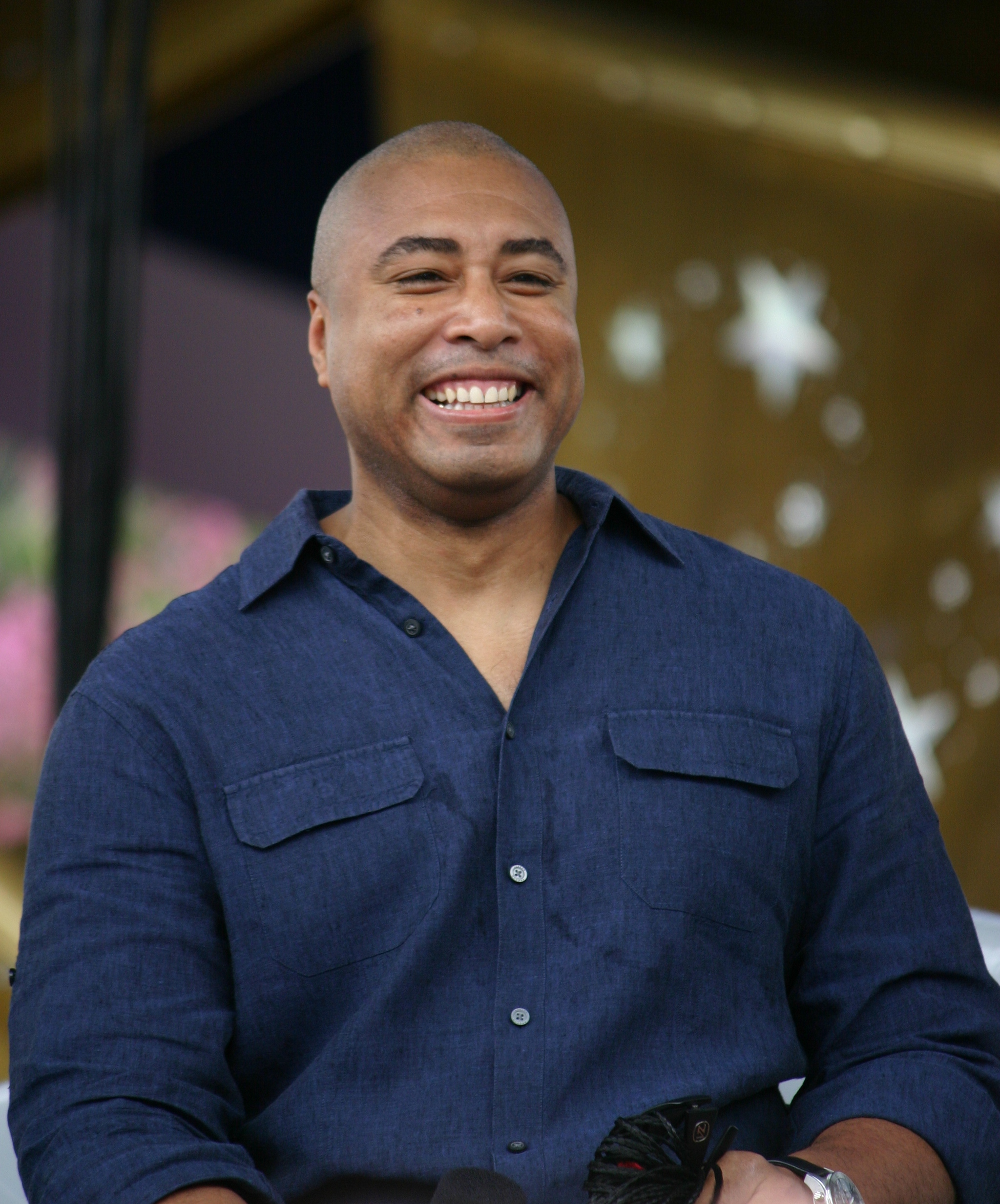
Bernie Williams

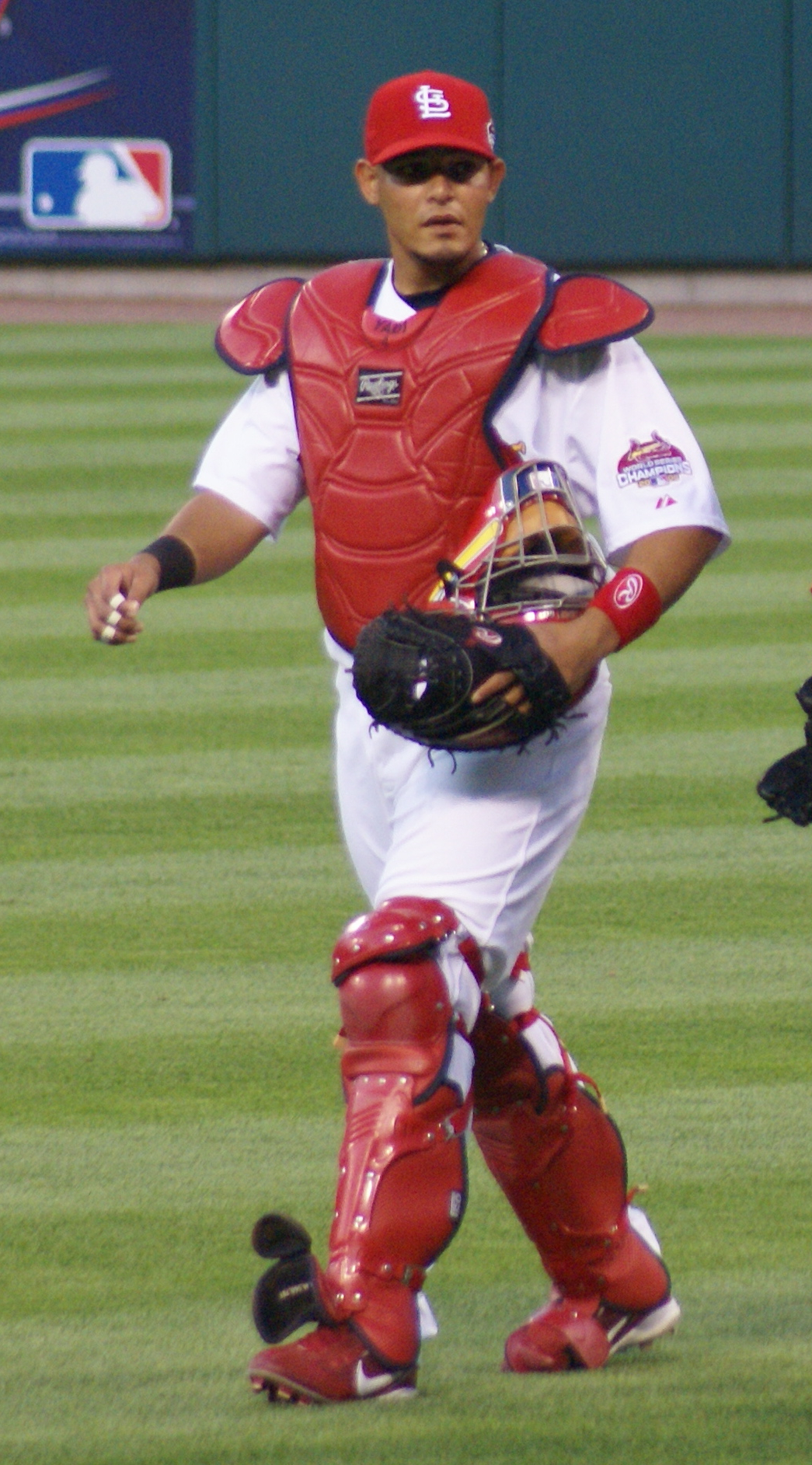
Yadier Molina

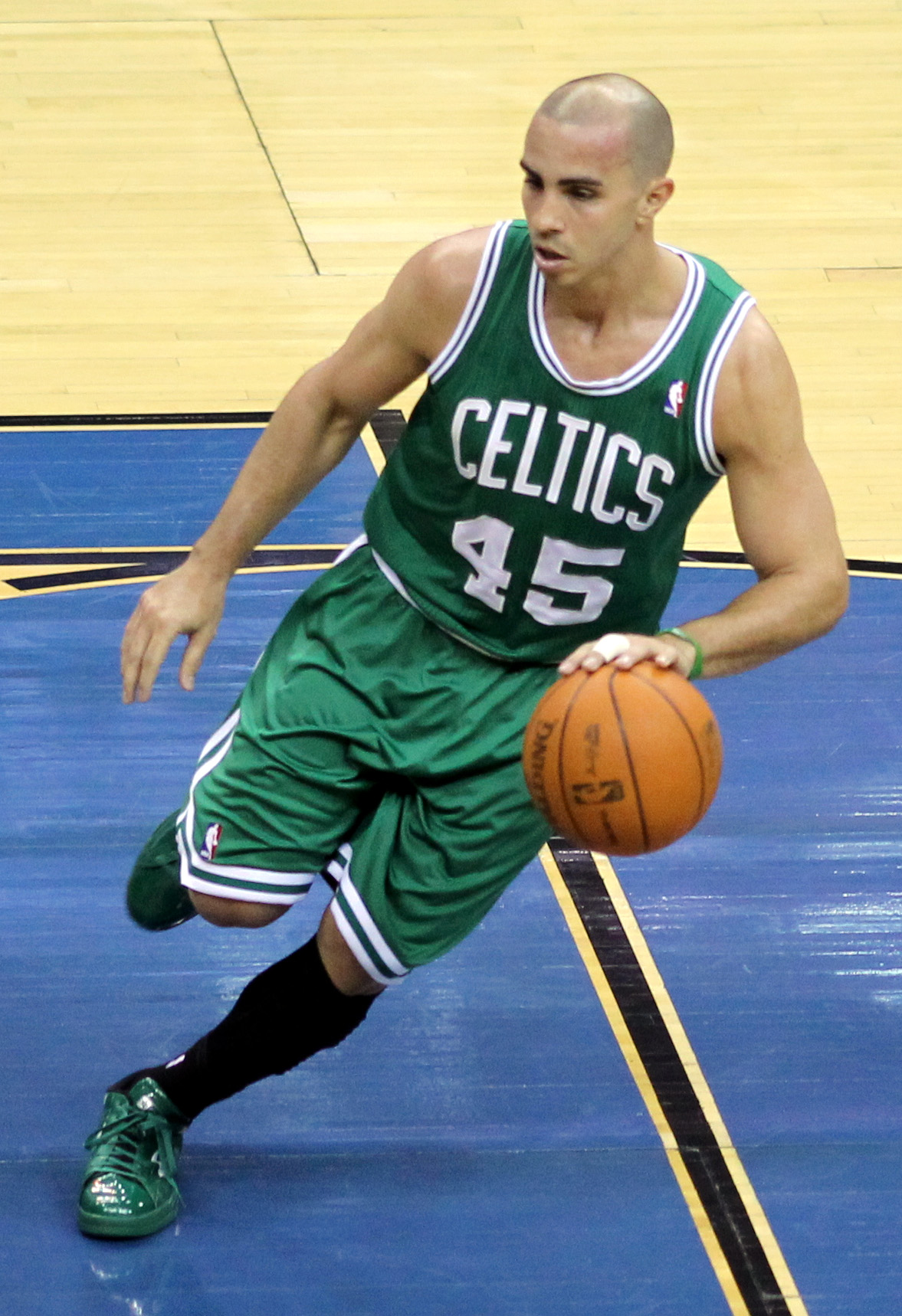
Carlos Arroyo

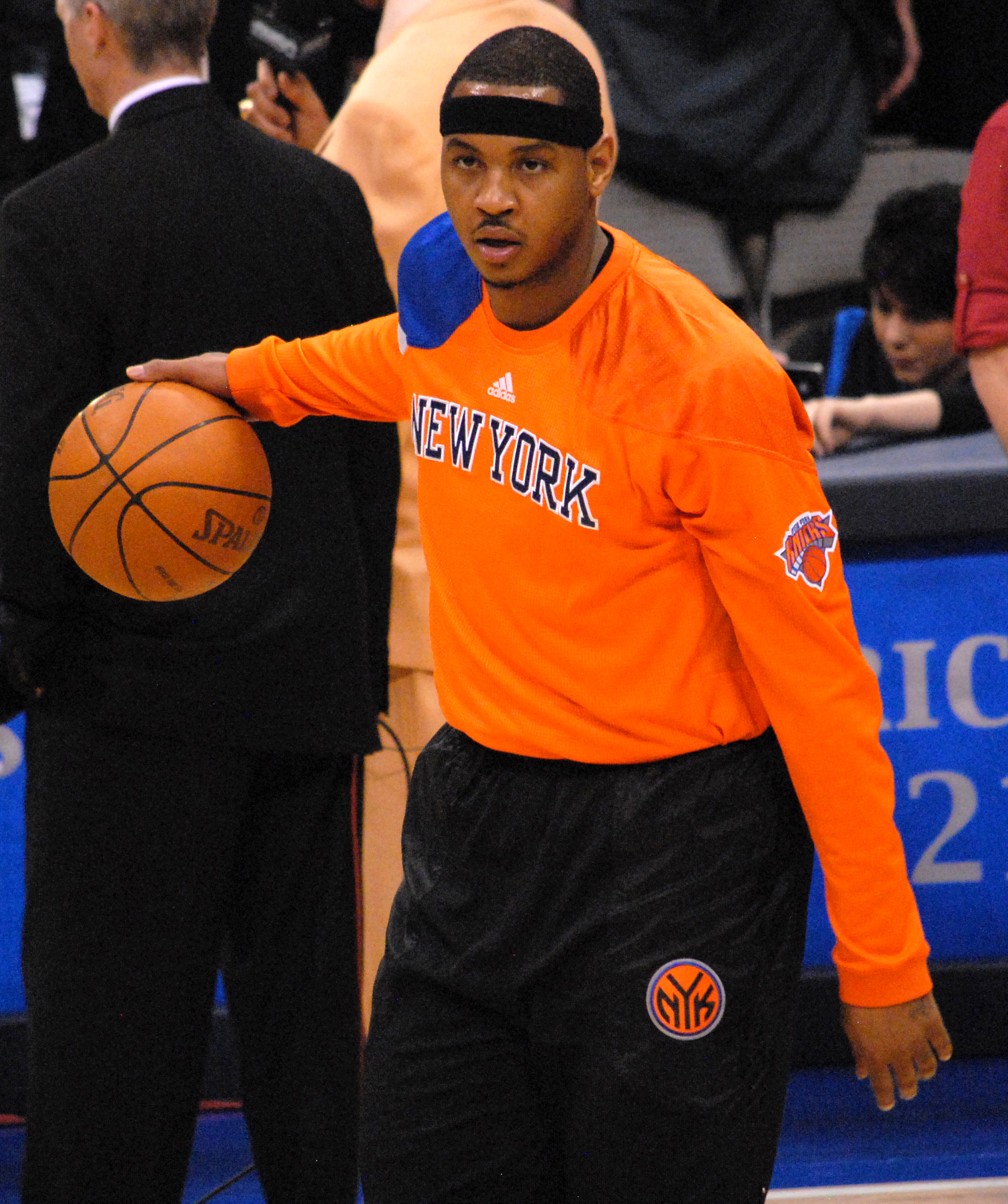
Carmelo Anthony

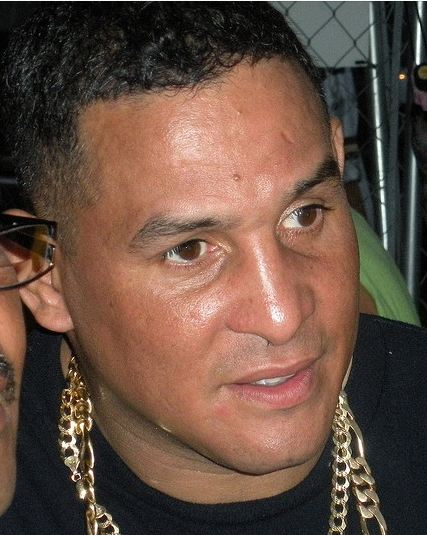
Héctor Camacho

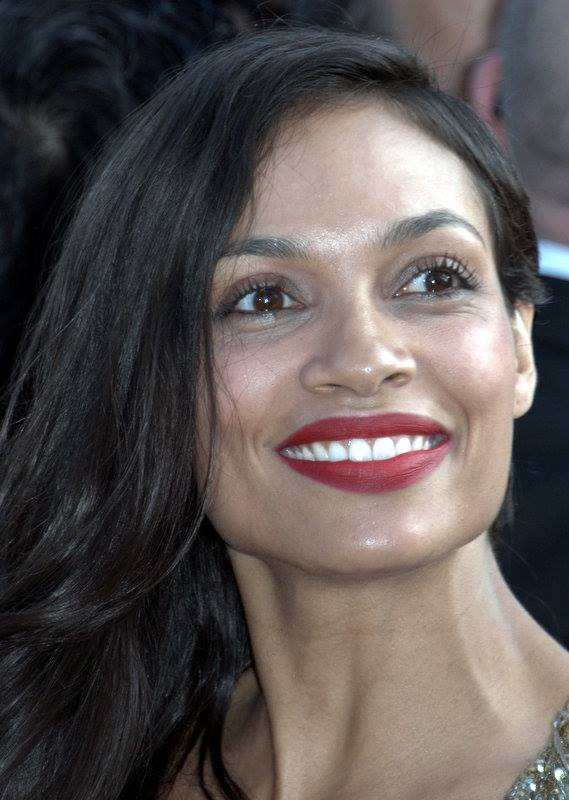
Rosario Dawson

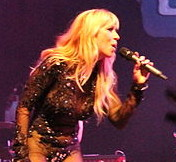
Noelia

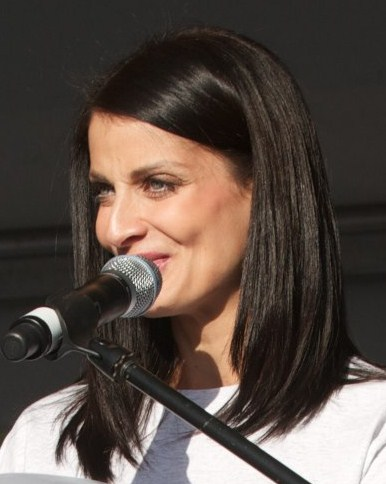
Dayanara Torres

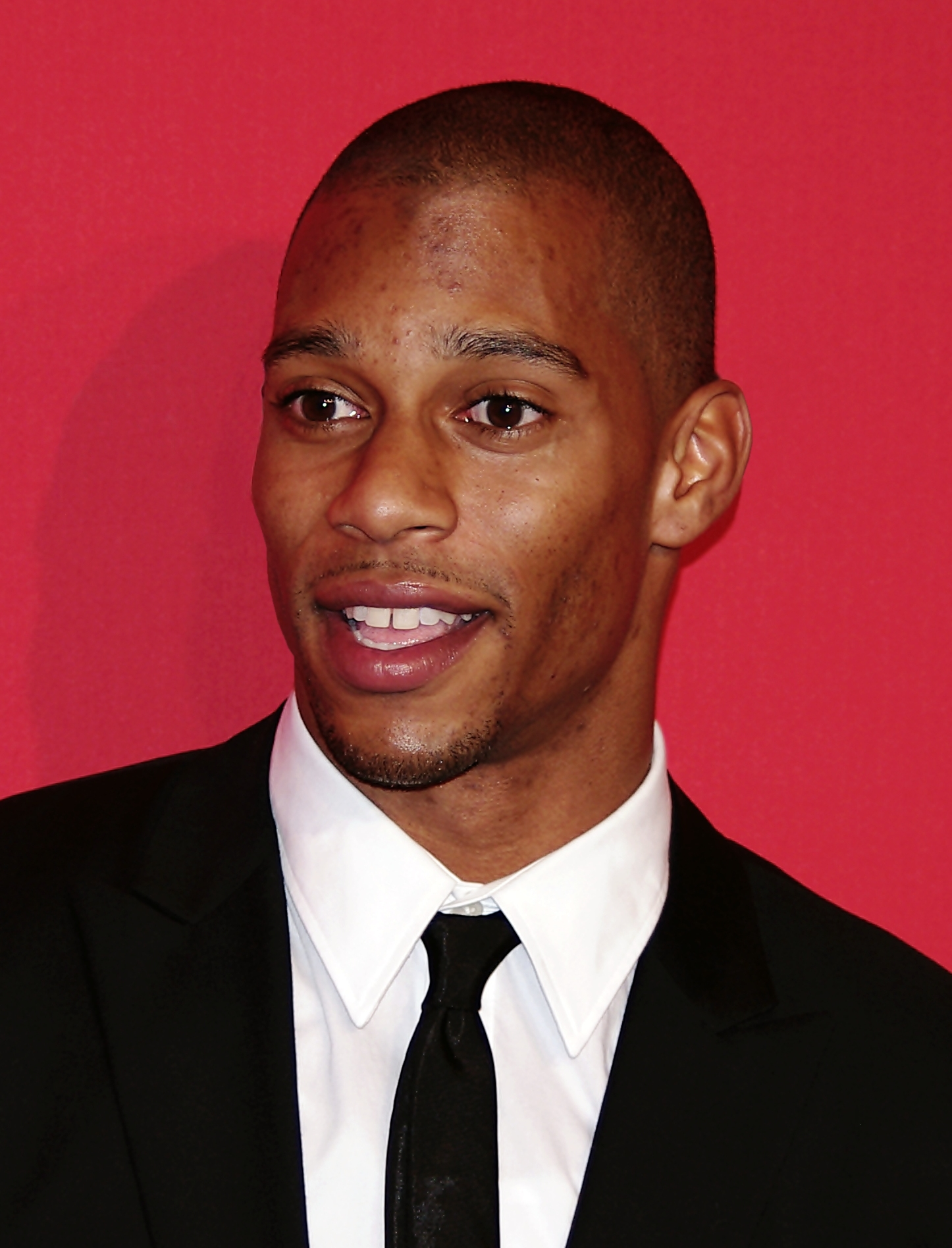
Victor Cruz

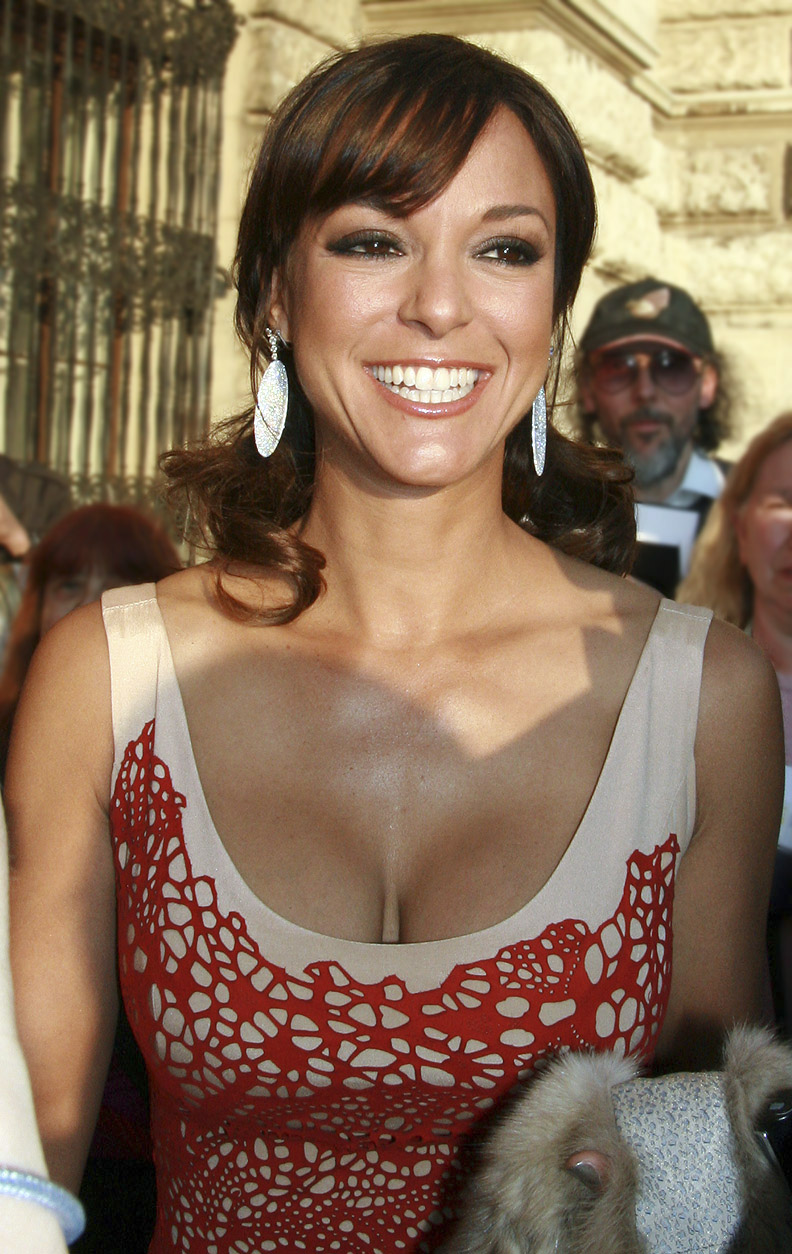
Eva LaRue

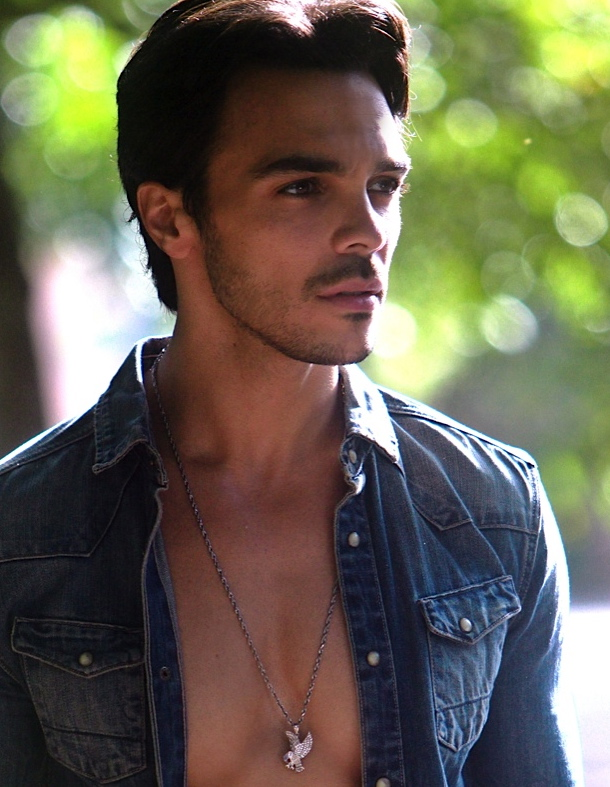
Shalim Ortiz

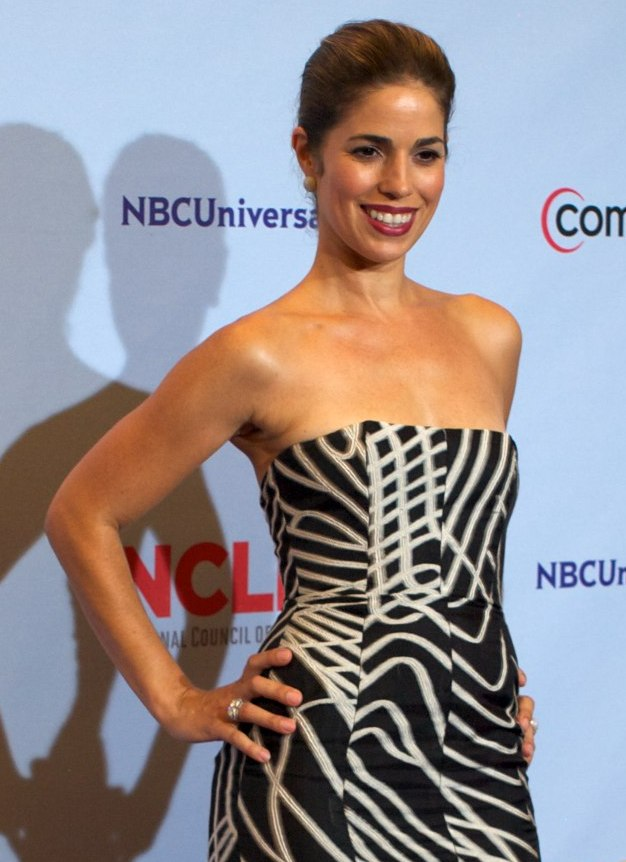
Ana Ortiz

== See also ==
- Military history of Puerto Rico
- Lists of people by nationality
- List of stateside Puerto Ricans
- List of Puerto Rican military personnel
- List of Puerto Ricans in the United States Space Program
- List of Puerto Ricans of African descent
- List of Major League Baseball players from Puerto Rico
- List of Puerto Rican boxing world champions
- List of Puerto Rican scientists and inventors
- List of Puerto Rico suffragists
- List of Puerto Rican Presidential Medal of Freedom recipients
- List of Puerto Rican Presidential Citizens Medal recipients
- History of women in Puerto Rico
- List of People from Ponce, Puerto Rico
- Cultural diversity in Puerto Rico
  - Chinese immigration to Puerto Rico
  - Corsican immigration to Puerto Rico
  - French immigration to Puerto Rico
  - German immigration to Puerto Rico
  - Irish immigration to Puerto Rico
  - Jewish immigration to Puerto Rico

== Bibliography ==
- Luis, William (Autumn 1992), "From New York to the World: An Interview With Tato Laviera" (PDF), Callaloo, 15 (4): 1022–1033, doi:10.2307/2931917, hdl:1803/3978, JSTOR 2931917, archived (PDF) from the original on October 9, 2022. (JSTOR subscription required to access article online.)
- Martínez, Elena (2016). "Hernández, Victoria (1897–1998), Latin music entrepreneur". In Knight, Franklin W.; Gates, Henry Louis Jr. (eds.). Dictionary of Caribbean and Afro–Latin American Biography. Oxford, England: Oxford University Press. ISBN 978-0-199-93580-2. – via Oxford University Press's Reference Online (subscription required)
- "1910 U. S. Federal Census, Tamarindo, Aguadilla, Puerto Rico". FamilySearch (in Spanish). Washington, D.C.: U.S. National Archives and Records Administration. April 21, 1910. pp. 10A–10B. NARA microfilm publication T624, roll #1757, p. 10A lines 23–25 and on p. 10B lines 26–27.
