= Nazario Collection =

Cache of carved stones found in Guayanilla, Puerto Rico

Piedras del Padre Nazario
- Material: Serpentinite
- Size: Varies
- Writing: 15 to 20 glyphs of unknown origin, separated by lines, with a variance in order and arranged in grids.
- Created: c. 900 BC – 900 AD
- Discovered: c. 1870s
- Present location: Institute of Puerto Rican Culture; Museo de Arqueología, Historia y Epigrafía de Guayanilla; University of Puerto Rico; Smithsonian Institution; Peabody Museum of Archaeology and Ethnology

The Nazario Collection (Spanish: Colección Nazario), also known as Agüeybaná's Library (Spanish: Biblioteca de Agüeybaná), Father Nazario's Rocks (Spanish: Piedras del Padre Nazario), and the Phoenician Rocks (Spanish: Piedras Fenicias), are a cache of carved stones that originated at Guayanilla, Puerto Rico. According to contemporary accounts, the statuettes made of local serpentine rocks were first discovered by Catholic priest José María Nazario y Cancel during the 19th century, and feature unidentified petroglyphs that have been speculated to be connected to the Old World for over 130 years. Their original site was not far from Yauco and was underground, where it was hidden under a slate that concealed a tunnel. Overwhelmed with the quantity and difficulty of transporting a trove that totaled more than a ton, he opted to abandon his individual approach and recruited locals to aid in the moving of the rocks to his house, where he conducted the first research on them by comparing them to similar objects from other countries. Nazario would combine his research with his religious background, leading to the hypothesis that there might be some connection between them and the Ten Lost Tribes.

Due to the ramifications that their authentication would have on mainstream concepts of Pan-American history, the authenticity of the pieces has been in question from the onset, with researchers providing conflicting opinions. Despite this, several foreign archeologists traveled to Puerto Rico in order to study the pieces. Among those that inquired on the matter was ethnographer Alphonse Pinart, who examined the pieces and concluded that they were "undoubtedly authentic". The explorer also expressed concern that some people could try to falsify pieces to receive gifts in exchange for them. Locally, historians took an interest in the matter while archeologists did not study them for decades. After the death of Nazario, most pieces were kept at the Institute of Puerto Rican Culture (ICP), with others being kept by the UPR and foreign institutions in New York, Spain and Paris. During the 1980s, the Collection attracted historian Aurelio Tío, who tried to recruit a variety of institutions to the cause of studying the pieces.

During the 2010s, the study of the pieces was led by archeologist Reniel Rodríguez Ramos of the University of Puerto Rico at Utuado in collaboration with experts from Universidad del Turabo, the University of Miami and University of Haifa, among others. Radiocarbon dating of soot impregnated in the glyphs supported an ancient origin, with a date range of 900 BC – 900 AD. Geological studies concluded that the petroglyphs were carved in Puerto Rico and that the serpentine rocks were local. Preliminary results using high power microscopes found that the technique used was unlike any those of the local native groups, while another from a use-wear laboratory concludes that stone tools were used. Preliminary epigraphic studies found similarities between the petroglyphs and the Libyco-Berber alphabet as recorded in the Canary Islands and the Tartessian language of the Iberian Peninsula.

== Discovery and relocation ==
=== Exploration at Río Coayuco ===
José M. Nazario in clergical clothing.

The discovery of the rocks is attributed to Catholic priest José María Nazario y Cancel, a native of the municipality of Sabana Grande that had settled in Guayanilla and had received education at the University of Salamanca that included, among other things, the study of ancient languages. (Note: Nazario was first appointed priest of Guayanilla in 1866, serving the office for 46 years. He was known for his archeological and philosophical research and a particular interest in the influence of the Agüeybaná dynasty in the Caribbean. Nazario was also an author and published Guayanilla y la Historia de Puerto Rico, in which he analyzed the second voyage of Christopher Columbus and cited evidence for the likelihood that the municipality was the landing point of this expedition at Puerto Rico.) The popular story of the event was told by the priest to historian Adolfo de Hostos. According to this narrative, sometime during the late 1870s the minister was summoned to the deathbed of a local woman of Taíno ascent. There she, who was aware of Nazario's interest in archeology and native history, decided to reveal the location of a long-hidden collection of artifacts. This knowledge had been covertly passed from generation to generation throughout the centuries, but she decided to reveal it in hopes that the priest would recognize its historical importance and safeguard it from that point on. With time, the old woman was given the name of "Juana Morales" and was claimed to be "the last descendant" of Agüeybaná II or Agüeybaná El Bravo, the last ruler of the Puerto Rico natives and military leader during the Spanish–Taíno War of San Juan–Borikén (from whom the rocks get one of their colloquial namesakes), elements that were not found in the original version. There is no record of an elder person by that name dying during the time in the municipality's records, but there is a local Morales family that lives at Barrio Indio and has its oral tradition of the events dating back to at least the 1970s.

Nazario then traveled between municipalities until he arrived at a riverside location in what is now speculated to have been the modern barrio Indios, reaching a stone slab that was meant as a marker. Digging the terrain, the priest found a tunnel and continued rummaging until he reached an alcove within which were more than 800 rocks and stones of varying sizes several of which had anthropomorphic shape, all covered in unknown petroglyphs that did not match any Amerindian civilization known to have lived in Puerto Rico or the Caribbean. From 1880 onwards, the rocks were taken to Nazario's personal house at Guayanilla, not the parochial house, where he kept the other fragments of this finding and several other archeological pieces as part of his collection. (Note: The structure was worth 250 Spanish pesos and he established an impromptu museum within it.) Nazario gave the people involved in the extraction a modest reward for bringing pieces there. In 1883, Agustín Stahl and Román Baldorioty de Castro visited the house and discussed the possibility of creating the Puerto Rico Museum of Natural History.

=== Early research ===
Nazario named them antropoglifitas (hispanized from the Greek "antropōmorphos", which relates to having human-like characteristics, and "gluphē", which refers to carvings) and considered each individual piece a volume in a larger story. In his writings, Nazario stated that they had been found packed in a small area and at a distance that was "not extraordinarily away from Guayanilla", speculating if they had been hidden there to avoid being lost at war (between the local and foreign natives) due to its proximity to the chiefdom of Agüeybaná. The priest was close to physician and author Manuel Zeno Gandía, with whom he exchanged correspondence and would later join him in a historical debate over the location of Columbus' arrival to Puerto Rico. Nazario gave him two pieces of the Collection to him and requested that they were kept safe and close. In 1881, when Zeno Gandía was chosen as representative of the Puerto Rican media in the activities held to commemorate Pedro Calderón de la Barca's second centenary in Spain, he took the pieces to the founder of the Museo Nacional de Antropología, Pedro González de Velasco, who according to the author insisted in keeping one of them. An agreement was reached between both, where the Spaniard accepted naming it after Nazario and gave credit to its discovery in Puerto Rico. This event caused a temporary estrangement between Zeno Gandía and the priest. After González de Velasco died the following year, the destination of the piece became unknown.

The first formal mention of the Collection was made by Alphonse Pinart in 1890, noting that the discovery was made near Yauco, in a place that he identifies as "Hanoa, Puerto Rico", and that some pieces displayed signs of being "undoubtedly authentic", but assumed that unscrupulous people fabricated their own to receive a reward. He further noted similarities between the characters in the Collection and known ancient alphabets, but declined speculating further on the matter. Pinart also embarked some pieces with him to the Musée d'Ethnographie du Trocadéro from which they were moved to the Musée du quai Branly when the former institution closed down, 38 pieces remain there and form the largest known concentration outside of Puerto Rico. Nazario later noted that besides France, other pieces had been taken by the researcher to Copenhagen and Philadelphia.

In 1893, Nazario wrote a piece named Escritura Aborigen de Carib (English: "Aboriginal writing of the Carib"), where he detailed his interpretations of the petroglyphs. (Note: "Carib" was the term used by Nazario when discussing the Taíno.) Analyzing the inscriptions, he dismissed a Taíno or Arawak origin and by 1897 had concluded that the carvings were more reminiscent of Chaldean or Hebrew languages, saying that he recognized some of the characters present. Nazario also asserted that based on the study of the petroglyphs, it was safe to conclude that the Pre-Columbian inhabitants of Puerto Rico had perfected writing beyond the natives of Mexico or Peru, speculating that the pieces could have been a Pre-Columbian national archive of some kind. Nazario would then begin an effort to translate the characters phonetically after acquiring a copy of 1889's Historia De Las Naciones: Caldea (English: "History of the Nations: Chaldea") and using the characters present in a Babylonian religious artifact reproduced there. The document would be modified and later become known as Escritura Fonética de los Indios de Puerto Rico (English: "Phonetic orthography of the Indians of Puerto Rico"). Nazario hypothesized that perceived linguistic similarities could imply that some of the Ten Lost Tribes crossed Asia making their way into the Bering Strait and traveled from there to North America, before dividing somewhere near Central America, from where they arrived to the Caribbean.

The conclusions reached by Nazario were met with skepticism by mainstream archeologists who labeled him as "imaginative [and/or] crazy", as it implied contact with the New World prior to Columbus' voyages, and speculation emerged that he perhaps paid a local jíbaro (a class of Puerto Rican countrymen) to sculpt the stones with a machete or file and that the petroglyphs were meaningless. A man only known as "Curros Quirós" was said to be involved in this practice, which modern academics consider the first recorded instance of archeological falsification in the Caribbean. In 1894, Nazario met Cayetano Coll y Toste, which whom he had been involved in a number of historical debates, at San Juan. Both discussed the possibility of the historian aiding in the process of deciphering the characters in the Collection, but the effort was aborted when the condition of sending the pieces to San Juan (to be returned later) was proposed. According to historian Otto Sievens, several of the rocks were thrown into a cistern at Guayanilla's church when the Americans arrived during the Spanish–American War. By 1903, Nazario was holding conferences about the Collection, which were unsuccessful in gaining the desired attention.

That same year, Jesse Walter Fewkes of the Smithsonian Institution, visited Puerto Rico and reportedly offered Nazario $800 to buy the pieces, but the offer was declined. In his subsequent report, the anthropologist concluded that the assemblage was the most intricate one among those that gathered native petroglyphs in Puerto Rico. However, in his examination of the carvings Fewkes also commented that the inscriptions were not Amerindian in origin and labeled them as "exotic", leading to an assumption that they may not be ancient. In his field notes, Fewkes notes that he was unable to find Nazario during a first visit in 1902, returning the following year. He also stated that the entire Collection was under a roof, that the pieces were classified by priority, and that the priest gave him his writings (which he discarded as not being authored by a scientist). Despite his skepticism, Fewkes took some pieces with him, which he placed in an exhibit along pieces of dubious origin at the National Museum of Natural History based on his initial assessment. This led to unrelated American archeologists assuming that the rocks were a forgery, discontinuing their investigation for several decades. Influenced by their foreign peer, local archeologists also lost interest in the Collection and stopped their inquiry for decades.

In an interview held in 1905, the priest showed Escritura Fonética de los Indios de Puerto Rico to journalist Gabriel A. Piles and discussed hypotheses about the arrival of Old World travelers as well as his efforts to translate the characters using Historia De Las Naciones: Caldea. Between 1911 and 1912, Nazario was transferred to San Juan while facing health issues. After being relocated, the priest had the Collection moved to the capital and kept it in his room. In 1908, Nazario wrote to Zeno Gandía informing him that a letter from Pinart had arrived, in the process making a throwaway remark noting that "it was almost incredible that 28 years [had already passed since their first meeting]", which would later allow to date the philologist's visit to 1880 and placed the original date of discovery sometime during the late 1870s. (Note: Nazario had been moved away from Guayanilla for some time, so the discovery had to take place between his return to the office in 1875 and Pinart's visit in 1880.) During this decade, Samuel Kirkland Lothrop visited Puerto Rico and took some pieces.

Archeologist Adolfo de Hostos visited Nazario in San Juan, where he was told the now-popular origin story. Taking some pieces with him, Hostos was still not convinced that the Collection (which at this point he estimates rounds the 700 pieces) possessed cuneiform characters, but still felt that it required detailed study. With the death of Nazario in 1919, the pieces became segregated, with only around 250 being acquired by collector Robert Junhans and later preserved at the Institute of Puerto Rican Culture. The first pieces arrived there during the 1950s, where they were placed in storage. The pieces in Hostos possession were granted to the University of Puerto Rico. These were relocated to the Museo de Historia, Antropología y Arte at Río Piedras. The ones owned by Lothrop were sent to the Peabody Museum of Archaeology and Ethnology. Alice de Santiago, a school teacher from Barceloneta, reportedly found a piece that was similar to those in possession of Nazario but made in limestone and contacted Zeno Gandía. The current whereabouts of this rock are unknown.

A number of writings authored by Nazario were later recovered by Zeno Gandía, who republished them in El Imparcial and claimed that he had seen Martin J. Berntsen of the Dominican priests of Bayamón taking some of the documents once his friend died, with the documents later being found by a priest in the parochial archives there. The origin story was first published by Hostos more than three decades later in 1955, having already deviated slightly from its original account by integrating elements related to the adaptation of the account to then-concurrent concepts. In it, he discussed a booklet filled with notes from Nazario being the last known person to see the lost document.

== Media exposure ==
=== Late 20th century ===
In 1969, Hostos sent one of the pieces to the British Museum so that it could be studied by scholar C.B.F. Walker, author of a number of books on cuneiform writing. Afterwards, Walker responded with an assessment that it possessed characteristics similar to pieces recorded circa 2000 B.C. and that it could be Sumerian in origin. During the 1980s, the president of the Academia Puertorriqueña de la Historia (English: "Puerto Rican Academy of History") Aurelio Tió revived the debate surrounding the pieces and began insisting on the thorough study of the inscriptions, citing that the idea that they were randomly inscribed with a machete was implausible. This historian dismissed the prevailing conclusions surrounding the rocks, noting that too much emphasis had been given to Fewkes' insinuation and that, despite the lack of formal studies by the anthropologist, it had somehow become widely accepted among local archeologists. Tío argued that if authenticated, the Collection could potentially represent one of the biggest archeological finds in the Americas and the Western Hemisphere, a position that he defended until his death. He unsuccessfully tried encouraging the Smithsonian, Harvard University, University of Valladolid, Yale University, University of Pennsylvania, the British Museum and archeologist Marcel Sigrist to retake the study of the pieces. In total, Tío wrote over 30 papers on the Collection evaluating its potential significance to local history and the possible influence on the Taíno population, which did not receive academic examination or rebuttals from the archeological community. He also commissioned a professional photographer to capture the first high quality images of the pieces, which were to be re-published in the media. Linguists from Spain, Portugal, Switzerland and France were involved in the issue, with the latter concluding that they could be legitimate.

=== Phoenician hypothesis ===
Despite not meeting with immediate success, the attempt to bring the topic to the mainstream did gather the interest of peripheral groups such as the Midwestern Epigraphic Society, which considered the pieces authentic in a report and established parallels between the symbols present in the petroglyphs and similar inscriptions present in copper and gold slabs recovered in Ecuador. Author Barry Fell concluded that the inscriptions were not random, and that the characters correspond to Pre-Greek characters found in Cyprus, Turkey and Crete, rearranged so that they would be phonetically read in Pre-Incan Quechuan. The speculation being that ancient Cyprians had previously interacted with the South American ethnic group and learned to write that language with their alphabet before reaching Puerto Rico and doing the same with the local population. According to Fell, evidence suggesting the authenticity of the petroglyphs emerged with the discovery (along the relevant civilization) of a similar grid-based and acrostic language by Pedro I. Porrás Garcés at Ecuador in 1961, which was first detailed in his an article titled "Arqueología de la Región Oriental" (English: "Archeology of the Oriental Region"). The document also notes similarities with characters present in the royal robe of Viracocha Inca, leading to the hypothesis that they were huacas and that one particular piece was dedicated to a request to Mamai, the title invested to the Incan queen. Fell concludes that the Collection would represent the largest finding related to this culture and the only one outside South America. The report gathered some interest, but conflicting views within the mainstream media resulted in stagnation of the topic.

=== Public exhibitions ===
After the death of Aurelio Tió, others that have promoted the topic include Antonio Molina and his daughter, Zoé Tió. In Guayanilla, biographer Norbeto Lugo and Irvin Sepúlveda have made efforts to foment the study on the pieces. In 2008, interest in the pieces surrounded the 175th Anniversary of the municipality's foundation. It was due to this celebration, where interest in Guayanilla's history peaked, that arrangements were made to have the Collection in public exhibition for the first time and the first time in decades that the topic returned to the mainstream media. The exhibition took place between March 27 and 28 at the behest of Leandro Hernández, director of the Centro Cultural María Arzola (English: "María Arzola Cultural Center") which also hosted the pieces. The municipal administration of Guayanilla then announced arrangements to have them permanently moved there in order to exhibit them. During the following year, interest in the Collection grew and the municipality began efforts to create the Museo de Epigrafía Lítica Padre Nazario (English: "Father Nazario Museum of Lithic Epigraphy") to emphasize them. Shortly afterwards, the finding became a central argument against the creation of an eolic park in the region. Upon opening, the museum featured a permanent exhibition where 19 pieces of the Collection were on display, among other archeological exhibitions relevant to the municipality. The topic re-entered the mainstream media in April 2016, with coverage related to a conference covering his research that was organized by Zoé Tió.

== Recent research ==
=== Studies on composition and characteristics ===
In 2012, research on the pieces returned to the mainstream academia with the involvement of Reniel Rodríguez Ramos from the University of Puerto Rico at Utuado, who was concerned that up to that point most of the local research had been carried by historians. (Note: Rodríguez is a lithic artifact expert and Ripley B. Bullen Award winner for "Outstanding Research in Caribbean Archaeology".) During his first visit to the ICP, he encountered part of the Collection being repurposed and the rest in storage. While attending an activity in the British Museum in 2014, Rodríguez took some pieces with him to the cuneiform exhibit, where he was casually presented to C.B.F. Walker while showing Jago Cooper a copy of Hostos' letter to the now-retired cuneiform expert. None of the present gave a definitive answer to their nature, but agreed that further study was needed. Parallel to this process, a documentary began being prepared by cinematographer Carlos García in collaboration with Rodríguez and his team.

Rodríguez discussing the work of Nazario.

In terms of characteristics, most pieces depict individuals in what appear to be varying ceremonial postures while wearing headwear and a tunic in which the petroglyphs are present. The group also examined other characters that deviated from the norm, such as those present at a site within the Guánica State Forest in an attempt to identify similar inscriptions. In relation to local natives, analogues are scarce and not identical, with some a similar headwear appearing in a piece unearthed at Tecla in Guayanilla and elements of clothing in idols (and additional symbols) being found at La Hueca in Vieques. Rodríguez has been unable to pinpoint the place referred to as "Hanoa, Puerto Rico" in Pinart's notes. Consequently, the research team carried sample collection in the south western coast of Puerto Rico, in particular the regions of Guayanilla and Yauco assumed to be near the initial discovery, such as Barrio Indios in Guayanilla and Barrio Barina in Yauco. After completing macroscopic examination, the prime matter is consonant with serpentinized peridotite with traces of bastite and mica typical in the region.

Efforts were made by the research team to retrieve as much firsthand information on the origin and history of the pieces as possible. With the collaboration of Laura Rodríguez from the Bayamón Central University, the archeologist was able to rummage through the Zeno Gandía Collection (a repository of documents and artifacts that used to belong to him) and retrieve the correspondence between Nazario and the author. By establishing the date of Pinart's first visit, Rodríguez attempted to prove if Nazario had access to sources detailing ancient writing similar to that exhibited in the Collection prior to this. In this regard, he concluded that since Historia De Las Naciones: Caldea was published at least nine years after the visit of Pinart, it could not have been used by Nazario to forge the characters. He also acquired Fewke's field notes with the help of Roberto Martínez. Rodríguez tried to pinpoint the location of González de Velasco's piece, but was told that it is no longer part of the Museo Nacional de Antropología's Puerto Rico exhibit.

The archeologist discussed how to proceed with people from a number of fields, including geology, chemistry and physics. To determine the chemical characteristics of the pieces, Antonio Martínez of the Physics Department of the UPR and Pablo Llerandi of General Studies at University of Puerto Rico, Río Piedras Campus (UPR-RP) have been involved in an initiative to complete studies on X-ray diffraction and spectrography, in order to further pinpoint the properties of the prime matter. In order to determine the characteristics of the traces the high power microscopes of the UPR-RP were used to carry out high magnification studies in which perpendicular striations were noted as part of a pointer drag technique. Some pieces do display characters that were added later than those in the others, implying that some were created afterwards. However, the manner in which some of the pieces have been intemperized (in particular the presence of differential intemperization in some that has rounded the edges of fractures in only one of the sides) is inconsistent with them being fabrications that were forged in the late 1870s and then stored indoors ever since, instead suggesting that they were exposed to the elements for a prolonged time period. Further efforts are being made to fund a collaboration with Leiden University to advance this research area with their specialists.

Carlos Silva of Universidad del Turabo has been involved in the 3D scanning of the pieces. The high definition imaging has led to the interest of philologist Christopher Rollston, whom Rodríguez considered a candidate to attempt the falsification of the Old World hypothesis. Studies in thermoluminescence have been proposed to establish the last time that the rocks were set on fire. Some of the artifacts were burned after the traces were made, with the pieces that fragmented during the process being plausible candidates. Others have carbon remnants that could be dated by employing the C-14 method, a procedure that resulted in a range of 900 BC to 900 AD. The general plan is to send separate pieces to the University of Washington Luminescence Dating Laboratory and to Oxford Authentication to compare results, which Rodríguez considers possibly conclusive. Towards this end, he has requested additional support from the ICP or the Official Historian of Puerto Rico.

=== Independent authentication ===
Some of the characters found in the pieces during a presentation by Reniel Rodríguez in 2019.

In Summer 2019, the results of two independent examinations of the pieces were published. The first, carried by Rollston, concludes that the glyphs in the pieces believed by Rodríguez to be ancient were not falsified by Nazario and that they likely represent a form of writing, which was organized within register lines. However, the specialist distanced from the transatlantic hypothesis and stated that it most likely represents an autochthonous system. In a subsequent interview, Rollston also argued that "these [symbols] are not Mesoamerican writing — they're not Aztec or Mayan — they're definitely not that". “Generic symbols”, with analogues in other languages, were observed.

Another, held on twenty pieces by a team led by Iris Groman-Yaroslavsky and carried at the Use-Wear Analysis Laboratory of the University of Haifa's Zinman Institute of Archeology, reaffirmed the presence of long-term weather degradation and determined that stone tools were used in the carving of the characters. Traces of gold and red pigment were also found.

=== Potential hypotheses ===
Based on his research, Rodríguez has formulated a number of hypotheses that are being currently examined without taking an a priori position about their authenticity or the possibility of fraud, with his initial position taking under consideration that some pieces where likely created after the initial discovery. If the entire Collection was proven to be fraudulent, he argued that the age of the pieces made them archeological artifacts in their right. He also formulated a preliminary hypothesis if several of the pieces were certified as authentic, for which he tried to identify similar geodesic characters. (Note: These are not common, and have only been found in the Caribbean at Mona Island, Salto Arriba in Puerto Rico, Bateyes de Viví in Cuba and Piedra Mapa in Santa Marta. Throughout the rest of the globe, their closest analogues are found at the Canary Islands.) Rodríguez also noted that religious idols found in the Canary Islands exhibit similar posture and facial features, which were not discovered until after the pieces were reportedly unearthed and he argues that Nazario could not have known. The preliminary character analysis, found that some were similar to the Libyco-Berber alphabet found in the archipelago.

After the initial studies, a set of cave paintings was uncovered near Playa Los Tubos, which Rodríguez decided to capture and send to Renata Springer Bunk (a philologist who has authored several books about the Libyco-Berber characters at the Canary Islands) who responded in the affirmative about their nature but lost interest after being told that they were found at Puerto Rico. Ultimately, he combined these with the seafaring nature of Caribbean natives and studies like one in which archeologist Richard Thomas Callahan of the University of Calgary studied how far the Canary Current could have dragged a drifting vessel, to formulate a hypothesis that he wanted to falsify. (Note: Callahan has studied the topic and published papers on his research, including a 2015 article titled "Drift Voyages across the Mid-Atlantic".)

Following the 2019 studies, Rodríguez distanced from previous stances and considered Nazario's "Ten Lost Tribes" hypothesis as falsified, since the similarities that were previously noted were insufficient to account for the fundamental differences found in the way that the languages were written (supporting Rollston's conclusions). However, he noted that the way they were kept under the custody of a select group was rare (seen in cases such as the Dead Sea Scrolls) and was quoted as saying that "[t]he hands that made these are different from the hands that made [other] artifacts in Puerto Rico." Rodríguez did not completely dismiss the possibility of inter-continental travel, stating that "[...] these stones could potentially be the first robust evidence to begin having a discussion about the possibility of pre-nautas (pre-Columbian mariners) [and that they] question the meta-narrative that Columbus brought writing and history with him", effectively pushing the definition of Puerto Rican history back thousands of years. In regards to other hypotheses, he is skeptical of Fell's conclusion and notes that some of the words that the zoologist translated as phonetic Quechan such as yuca, ungey, chayote or papaya are in fact Arawak in origin.
