= Francisco Quiñones =

Francisco Quiñones may refer to:

- Francisco Mariano Quiñones (1830–1908), proponent of the abolition of slavery and of the self-determination of Puerto Rico
- Francisco de Quiñones (ca. 1482–1540), Catholic cardinal and governor of Veroli and Campagna
- Francisco de Quiñónez, Royal Governor of Chile, 1599–1600
