= Edna Coll =

Puerto Rican educator and author (1906–2002)

- Born: Edna Coll Pujals; July 24, 1906; Arecibo, Puerto Rico
- Died: November 19, 2002 (aged 96); San Juan, Puerto Rico
- Education: University of Puerto Rico (PhD)
- Occupations: Educator, author
- Children: 2; including Fufi Santori
- Father: Cayetano Coll y Cuchí
- Relatives: Cayetano Coll y Toste (grandfather); José Coll y Cuchí (uncle); Isabel Cuchí Coll (cousin); Conchita Cuchí Coll (cousin)

Edna Coll Pujals (July 24, 1906 – November 19, 2002) was a Puerto Rican educator and author. She was president of the Society of Puerto Rican Authors in San Juan. Coll was also the founder of the Academy of Fine Arts in Puerto Rico.

== Early life and education ==
Edna Coll Pujals was born in Arecibo, Puerto Rico. Her parents were Cayetano Coll y Cuchí, a former President of Puerto Rico House of Representatives and Carmen Pujol Toste. Coll received her primary and secondary education in San Juan. She earned a doctorate in literature and arts from the University of Puerto Rico.

== Career ==
Coll was the president of the local chapter of the American Artists Professional League. She founded the Academy of Fine Arts in Puerto Rico in 1941. The academy, which is now known as the "Academia Edna Coll" (The Edna Coll Academy) and situated in San Juan, has served as the exposition center of art works by many of the Spaniard artists who fled Spain during the Spanish Civil War of the 1930s. Among the artists whose work has been exposed there are Angel Botello, Carlos Marichal, Cristobal Ruiz and Francisco Vazquez. Coll who presided over the academy from 1941 to 1954, was also a professor of fine arts at the University of Puerto Rico. In 1982, she served as president of the Society of the Puerto Rican Author.

According to the editorial of "Indice informativo de la novela hispanoamericana, Volume 5":

"Dr. Edna Coll is known in the Latin American literary world for having consecrated more than twenty years to unravel the sense of fiction creation in Spanish-speaking America, and to organize this sense in synthesis and perspectives which surpass the nations where each one of these authors write."

== Personal life ==
Coll came from a family of Puerto Rican educators, politicians and writers. Her grandfather Cayetano Coll y Toste (1850–1930), was a historian and writer. Her brother, Cayetano Coll y Pujol was a prominent attorney and judge. Her uncle José Coll y Cuchí was the founder of the Puerto Rican Nationalist Party and her cousins Isabel Cuchí Coll was a journalist and author, and Conchita Cuchí Coll de Carlo was a pacifist.

Coll was married to Jose Santori and had two children, Vicente Santori Coll, an attorney and Fufi Santori. On November 19, 2002, she died in San Juan.

== Selected works ==
- Coll, Edna (1965). Chile y los chilenos Fart Bello (in Spanish). Ediciones Juan Ponce de León.
- Coll, Edna (1974). Indice informativo de la novela hispanoamericana (1 ed.). Editorial Universitaria, University of Puerto Rico. ISBN 0-8477-2005-5. OCLC 1743619.
- Coll, Edna (1994). El valle de los caídos (in Spanish). Publicaciones Yuquiyú.
- Coll, Edna. (1999). Florilegio. Editorial Plaza Mayor. ISBN 1-56328-158-9. OCLC 44409223.
