= Isabel Cuchí Coll =

Puerto Rican journalist and writer (1904–1993)

- Born: March 28, 1904; Arecibo, Puerto Rico
- Died: December 22, 1993; San Juan, Puerto Rico (aged 89)
- Occupations: Director, "Sociedad de Autores Puertorriqueño"
- Relatives: Cayetano Coll y Toste (grandfather); José Coll y Cuchí (uncle); Cayetano Coll y Cuchí (uncle); Edna Coll (cousin); Jose "Fufi" Santori Coll (cousin)

Isabel Cuchí Coll (March 28, 1904 – December 22, 1993) was a journalist, writer and the Director of the Sociedad de Autores Puertorriqueños (Society of Puerto Rican Authors). She came from a family of Puerto Rican historians and politicians.

== Early life and education ==
Cuchí Coll was one of six siblings born to Luisa Coll y Cuchí (daughter of Cayetano Coll y Toste) and Luis Cuchí Arnau in Arecibo, Puerto Rico. Her sister, Conchita, was the first Puerto Rican woman nominated for the Nobel Peace Prize.

Cuchí Coll's grandfather Dr. Cayetano Coll y Toste (1850–1930), was a historian and writer. Her uncle José Coll y Cuchí was the founder of the Puerto Rican Nationalist Party and her other uncle Cayetano Coll y Cuchí, was once the President of Puerto Rico House of Representatives. Her cousin (José's daughter) Edna Coll was an educator and author who founded the Academy of Fine Arts in Puerto Rico. Her second cousin, (Edna's son), Jose "Fufi" Santori Coll was a former BSN basketball player, coach and television sportscaster.

She studied journalism after completing her formal primary and secondary education. In the 1920s, Cuchi Coll moved to New York City with her parents and resided at West 84th Street in Manhattan. After her father died, she and her brothers Louis, Victor, Enrique and sisters Margarita and Conchita where raised by their mother.

== Career ==
In the early 1930s, Cuchí Coll returned to Puerto Rico and began her career as a journalist with the magazine Puerto Rico Ilustrado (Puerto Rico Illustrated). As a writer, she also collaborated with various other news forums..

In January 1937, Cuchí Coll interviewed Agustín Barrios Mangoré, a guitarist from Paraguay during the concert "La Momia del Cacique" presented in the San Juan's Teatro Paramount. The interview was published in the Puerto Rico Ilustrado magazine with a photo of Barrios Mangoré dressed as Cacique Mangoré dedicated to Cuchí Coll. The interview, which was recovered recently, is considered as historically important by the authorities of Paraguay because it gives the only known published impression of the artist in regard to the legend of the Cacique mommy.

Cuchí Coll was named director of the "Sociedad de Autores Puertorriqueños" (Society of Puerto Rican Authors). Under her directorship, she helped to promote the written works of various Puerto Rican authors. In 1972, she published some of the works of her grandfather, Cayetano Coll y Toste including Historia de la esclavitud en Puerto Rico (información y documentos) (History of Slavery in Puerto Rico (documents and information)). She also published Dos Poetisas de América: Clara Lair y Julia de Burgos.

== Later life ==
In her later years, she contributed to the promotional program of the Puerto Rican Institute of Culture. On December 22, 1993, Cuchí Coll died in San Juan, Puerto Rico.

== Written works ==
Among her written works in Spanish are the following:

- "Del Madrid Literario"
- "Oro Nativo"
- "La Novia del Estudiante"

=== Other ===
Two of her most important written works are "Mujer (1945))" (Woman) and the drama "La Familia de Justo Malgenio (1961)) (The family of Just Bad mood). Among her published work are the following:

- "Mujer"; Publisher: Imprenta Aleu, San Juan de Puerto Rico; ASIN: B00525T1N0
- "The Student's Sweetheart (a Drama in Three Acts)"; 1973; ASIN: B001IPBBIQ.
- "La familia de Justo Malgenio: Three act comedy: Puerto Ricans in New York"; 1974; ISBN 84-399-1997-2; ISBN 978-84-399-1997-1
- "My Puerto Rican Poppa (A Comedy in Three Acts) [Puerto Rican]"; Jean H De Porrata (Translator); 1974; SIN: B000M3E1L4
- "Historia de la esclavitud en Puerto Rico (información y documentos)"; Cayetano Coll y Toste (Author), Isabel Cuchí Coll (Editor); Publisher: Sociedad de Autores Puertorriqueño; ASIN: B0030P6XNK

== See also ==
- List of Puerto Ricans
- History of women in Puerto Rico
