= Pilar Barbosa =

Puerto Rican historian

Official Historian of Puerto Rico
- In office 1993–1997
- Preceded by: Adolfo de Hostos
- Succeeded by: Luis González Vales

Personal details
- Born: Adolfo José de Hostos y de Ayala; July 4, 1898 Bayamón, Puerto Rico
- Died: January 22, 1997 (aged 98) San Juan, Puerto Rico
- Spouse: José Ezequiel Rosario
- Education: Clark University (PhD)
- Occupation: historian, educator and political activist

Pilar Barbosa de Rosario (July 4, 1898 – January 22, 1997) was an educator, historian and political activist. She was the first female Official Historian of Puerto Rico.

== Early years ==
Barbosa, born in Bayamón, Puerto Rico, was one of twelve children of Jose Celso Barbosa, also known as the "Father of the Puerto Rican Statehood Movement". Her father was a member of the Puerto Rican Senate from 1917-1921. Barbosa received her primary and secondary education in Bayamon and was exposed to politics at a young age. As a teenager she enjoyed teaching others. After she graduated from high school, she enrolled in the University of Puerto Rico. She was married to José Ezequiel Rosario but lived many decades as a widow.

== Educator and political activist ==
Barbosa earned her bachelor's degree in education and then went on to Clark University in Worcester, Massachusetts, where she earned her Doctorate Degree in History. In 1921, she returned to the island and was offered the position of history professor at the College of Liberal Arts of the University of Puerto Rico, thus becoming the first woman to teach in that institution.

In 1929, she established the Department of History and Social Sciences in her Alma Mater and was its director until 1943. She continued to teach at the university until 1967, the year she retired. Barbosa was also very active in her father's cause and served as political advisor and mentor to many of the politicians who shared her father's political goals, most notably those from the pro-statehood New Progressive Party, including former Resident Commissioner and Governor from 2009 to 2013 Luis Fortuño and former Senate of Puerto Rico President and 2009-2013 Puerto Rico Secretary of State Kenneth McClintock. Her goal for the party was that it become known as the party of statehood and social justice.

== Awards and recognitions ==
Among the many awards and recognitions bestowed upon her are the following:

- Professor Emerita - University of Puerto Rico - 1973
- Doctor of Letters, Honoris Causa - Interamerican University - 1975
- Outstanding Leadership Award - President Ronald W. Reagan - 1984
- Golden Book - Exchange Club of Rio Piedras

Barbosa was also a member of various organizations, including The Royal Spanish Academy of History, Dean of Puerto Rican Historians and The Academy of Arts and Sciences in Puerto Rico. In 1993, she was named by the Legislative Assembly to the position of Official Historian of Puerto Rico which was re-established that year.

== Written works ==
Among the books written by Barbosa are the following:

- De Baldorioty a Barbosa: La Comision Autonomista de 1896 (From Baldorioty to Barbosa: The Autonomist Commission of 1896)
- La Politica en los tiempos (Aleto Manuel F. Rossy ciudadano cabal) (Politics in the times (Aleto Manuel F. Rossy, a well-rounded citizen))
- Raices del Progreso Politico Puertorriqueño (Roots of the Puerto Rican Political Progress)

== Later years ==
Barbosa became a widow when her husband, economics professor José Ezequiel Rosario, died in 1963.

Puerto Rico Senate President Roberto Rexach Benitez and House Speaker Zaida Hernandez appointed Barbosa in 1993 as the first modern Official Historian of Puerto Rico, a post she held unter her death in 1997.

Pilar Barbosa de Rosario died on January 22, 1997, in San Juan, Puerto Rico at the age of 98 and was survived by a brother, Rafael Barbosa. She was buried at Santa María Magdalena de Pazzis Cemetery in San Juan.

== Legacy ==
On July 27, 1997, the Senate of Puerto Rico approved law #53, authored by Sen. Kenneth McClintock, a Barbosa protégé, which created "Pilar Barbosa Education Internship Program". The program was created as a means to provide professional development training opportunities for public school practitioners and educators in Puerto Rico. The Pilar Barbosa Program serves as a catalyst for long term educational realignment using the graduates as agents of sustainable reform in the public school system.

Program participants are K-12 public school teachers and administrators from Puerto Rico. Every summer, 25 participants come to Washington, D.C. to take part in a myriad of activities including workshops, tours, lectures and group assignments that focus on U.S. education trends and policies in the context of Puerto Rico, integration of technology in the curriculum, innovative curriculum design, and educational leadership. The Washington Center for Internships and Academic Seminars successfully administered the Pilar Barbosa Education Internship Program in the summers of 1998, 1999, 2000, 2002, 2003, 2005, 2006, 2007, 2008 and 2009. The Washington Center provides an integrated academic and work experience to prepare participants for lives of leadership, professional achievement, and civic engagement. Nearly 298 teachers have already benefited from the program.

== See also ==
- List of Puerto Ricans
- History of women in Puerto Rico

Political offices
Preceded by Adolfo de Hostos	Official Historian of Puerto Rico; 1993–1997	Succeeded by Luis González Vales
