= Cayetano Coll y Cuchí =

Puerto Rican activist (1881–1961)

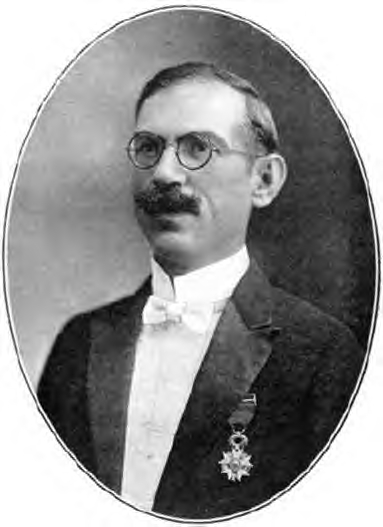
- Former President of Puerto Rico House of Representatives pictured with the French Legion of Honor
- Born: June 21, 1881; Arecibo, Puerto Rico
- Died: 1961 (aged 79–80); San Juan, Puerto Rico
- Movement: Puerto Rican independence movement

Notes
- Cayetano and his brother José, who founded the Nationalist Party of Puerto Rico, once served together in the Union Party

Cayetano Coll y Cuchí (June 21, 1881 – 1961) was a politician, writer and an advocate of Puerto Rican Independence. In 1917, he became the first President of Puerto Rico House of Representatives after the island was ceded to the United States by Spain as a result of the Spanish–American War. Coll y Cuchí was a member of a prominent family of Puerto Rican politicians, writers and educators. (Note: see: "Notable family members" section)

== Early years ==
Coll y Cuchi was born in Arecibo, Puerto Rico. His father was Cayetano Coll y Toste, a historian who in 1913 was named the "Official Historian of Puerto Rico" and his mother Adela, was the daughter of José Cuchi y Arnau former mayor of Arecibo. His family sent him to private schools for his primary and secondary education. Coll y Cuchi began his university education at the University of Barcelona. In 1910, he earned his law degree from a college in Washington, D.C.. After he earned his degree he returned to the island and established his law practice.

== Political career ==
Cayetano Coll y Cuchí was a member of the Union Party of Puerto Rico, a major political party in Puerto Rico which was founded in February 1904 by Luis Muñoz Rivera, Rosendo Matienzo Cintrón, Antonio R. Barceló, José de Diego and others after the disbanding of the Federal Party. The party was a supporter of greater self-government for the island, though the party was divided between those in favor of independence and those favoring statehood. Coll y Cuchí was successful in the elections of 1908, 1910 and 1914 and represented his party in the Puerto Rican Camera of Delegates.

== Union Party of Puerto Rico ==
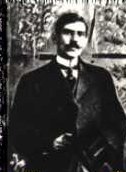
Cayetano Col y Cuchi

On February 7, 1910, U.S. Congressman Marlin E. Olmsted, who at the time served as Chairman of the United States House Committee on Insular Affairs, presented a project before Congress in which U.S. citizenship would be optional for Puerto Ricans. If the Bill passed Puerto Ricans would have the option of having American citizenship instead of Puerto Rican citizenship with the condition that those who choose the American citizenship would swear allegiance to the United States. The Bill was also specific in that only the Puerto Ricans with the American citizenship would be allowed to vote in the local elections. The Union Party organized a protest committee which besides Coll y Cuchí included party president Luis Muñoz Rivera and Eugenio Benitez Castaño. The committee traveled to Washington, D.C., and presented their protest to the measure. The protest was successful and the Bill died in the U.S. Senate floor.

In 1917, after the death of Luis Muñoz Rivera, Antonio R. Barceló became the leading force behind the liberal ideas of the island. Barceló, José de Diego and Coll y Cuchí were against the creation of the Jones–Shafroth Act which would impose United States citizenship upon the citizens of Puerto Rico because the act represented an impediment to Puerto Rican independence as a final status solution and because the judicial and executive branches would still be controlled by the United States. The Jones–Shafroth Act, however was approved by the United States and signed into law by President Woodrow Wilson on March 2, 1917. The Union Party under Barceló's leadership then resolved to adopt a different stance and to seek more self autonomy and the right for the people of Puerto Rico to elect their own governor. Barceló believed that this would eventually led to Puerto Rico's independence. De Diego, a strong independence advocate, was prompted by this move to have great differences with the majority of his party members. De Diego was known among his peers as the "Father of the Puerto Rican Independence Movement".

Coll y Cuchí was among those in the party who favored the independence of Puerto Rico. Hostilities between the members who wanted independence and those who favored Statehood for Puerto Rico was evident. Party member Juan Bernardo Huyke, had previously served as President of the Camara of Delegates. In 1917, The Camara of Delegates was renamed "The House of Representatives of Puerto Rico". Huyke, who was among the party members who favored Statehood for Puerto Rico, was nominated for a position in the first House of Representatives of Puerto Rico. He left the party before the elections were held because of political differences and was substituted by Coll y Cuchí. In the elections held on July 6, 1917, Coll y Cuchí and José de Diego were both elected to the House of Representatives of Puerto Rico and Coll y Cuchí was named the first president of said legislative body.

By 1919, Coll y Cuchi's brother, José felt that the Union Party wasn't doing enough for the cause of Puerto Rico and together with some followers departed from the party and formed the Nationalist Association of Puerto Rico in San Juan. During that time there were two other organizations that were pro-independence, they were the Nationalist Youth and the Independence Association of Puerto Rico. A fusion of the three political organizations in September 17, 1922, would give birth to the Puerto Rican Nationalist Party. In which Cayetano's brother José Coll y Cuchí was elected president and José S. Alegría (father of Ricardo Alegría) vice-president. In 1924 Dr. Pedro Albizu Campos joined the party and was named vice-president.

== Alianza Party of Puerto Rico ==
In 1924, the Union Party joined with dissident members of the Republican Party to form the Alianza ("Alliance"). This group generally supported autonomy for Puerto Rico. Coll y Cuchí was among this group. In 1927, he wrote and published in a local newspaper a manifesto in regard to his political believes. He proclaimed that it was not practical nor possible for Puerto Rico to ask for admittance as a state of the United States nor for complete independence. He believed that Puerto Rico should become a commonwealth of the United States with a relationship similar to the one which Ireland and Canada had with England. In 1928, he joined the faction in the Alianza which opposed Robert H. Todd, a pro-statehooder, in his quest to run for the position of mayor of San Juan. That sector of the Alianza became known as the "leftist Unionists." Coll y Cuchí wanted the Alianza to embrace the ideals of the "old" Union party which wanted the independence of Puerto Rico.

On August 26, 1929, Coll y Cuchí attended an assembly held in San Juan, in which Antonio R. Barceló was calling for the rebirth of the Union Party. In accordance to their ideals the party was to be allied with the Republican Party of Puerto Rico, thereby making it a stronger party then the Alianza. In 1932, the Alianza party was divided. Those in the party who endorsed Puerto Rican independence were led by Barceló, Coll y Cuchí and Ernesto Ramos Antonini. However, due to legal issues involved, Barceló's section of the Alianza party was unable to use the name "Union Party" and therefore called themselves the Liberal Party. The pro-statehood faction, headed by José Tous Soto joined with the Socialist Party of Puerto Rico and formed the Republican Union. Coll y Cuchí was an active member of the governing staff of the Liberal Party.

== Notable family members ==
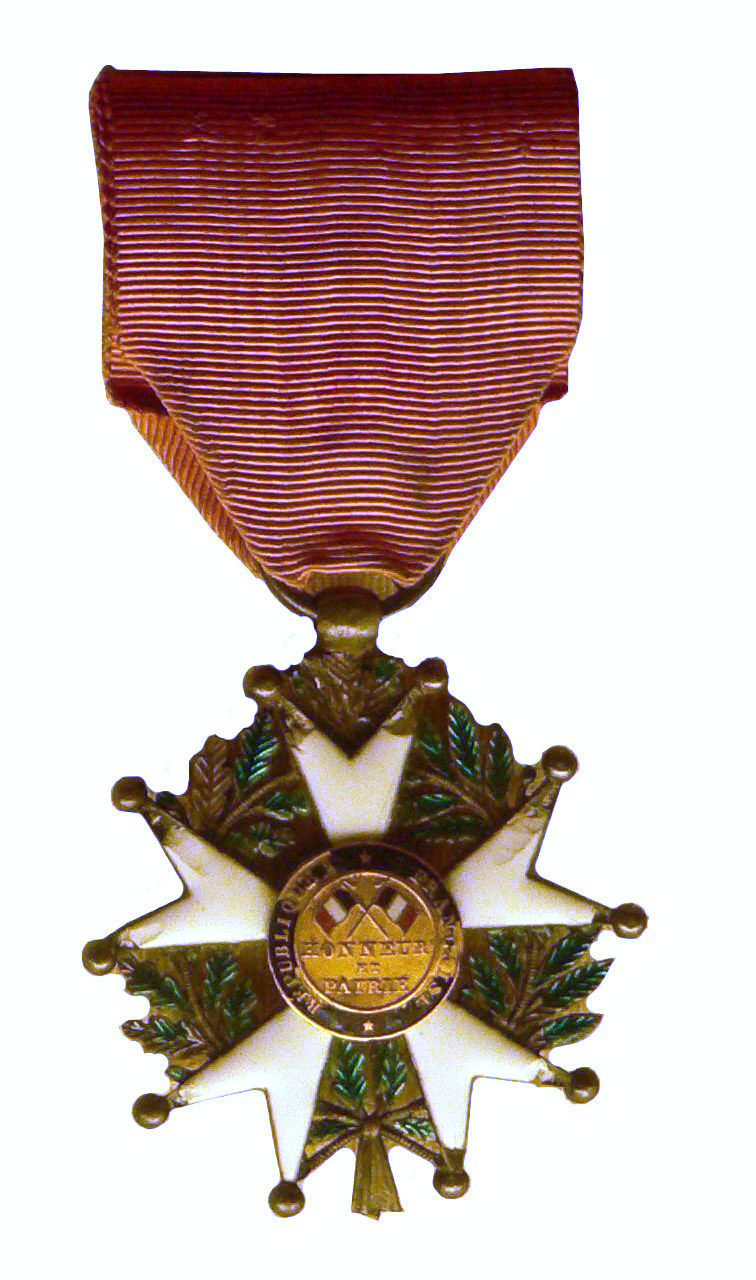
French Legion of Honor

Coll y Cuchí's father was Dr. Cayetano Coll y Toste (1850–1930), a historian and writer. His brother was José Coll y Cuchí was the founder of the Puerto Rican Nationalist Party and his daughter Edna Coll was an educator and author who founded the Academy of Fine Arts in Puerto Rico, his son Cayetano Coll y Pujol was a prominent attorney and judge in Puerto Rico. His nieces Isabel Cuchí Coll was a journalist and the Director of the "Sociedad de Autores Puertorriqueño" (Society of Puerto Rican Authors), and Conchita Cuchí Coll de Carlo was the first Puerto Rican woman nominated for the Nobel Peace Prize. His grandson, (Edna's son), Jose "Fufi" Santori Coll was a former BSN basketball player, coach and television sportscaster.

== Written work ==
- Selección de leyendas puertorriqueñas by Cayetano Coll y Cuchi published by Orion in México

== Later years ==
Among the Bills which he introduced to the Puerto Rican legislature and which were passed was the measure which established the first school for the blind in Puerto Rico. Coll y Cuchí received many awards from the Institute of Puerto Rican Literature for his journalistic work, plus he was also awarded the "Legion of Honor" by the French government.

Coll y Cuchí was married to Carmen Josefa Pujol. They had five children, Edna, who became a noted educator, Cayetano, Victor, Margarita and Diana. Coll y Cuchí died in 1961, in San Juan, Puerto Rico and buried at Cementerio San José also in Santurce, Puerto Rico.

== See also ==
- List of Puerto Ricans
- History of Puerto Rico

== Notes ==
Political offices
Preceded by Juan Bernardo Huyke	Speaker of the Puerto Rico House of Representatives; 1921–1923	Succeeded by Miguel Guerra Mondragrón
