= Mariano Abril y Ostalo =

Puerto Rican politician

Member of the Puerto Rico Senate from the Guayama district
- In office 1917–1920

Member of the Puerto Rico Senate At-large
- In office 1920–1924

Official Historian of Puerto Rico
- In office 1931–1935
- Preceded by: Cayetano Coll y Toste
- Succeeded by: Adolfo de Hostos

Personal details
- Born: 25 May 1861 San Juan, Captaincy General of Puerto Rico, Spanish Empire
- Died: 5 December 1935 (aged 74) San Juan, Insular Government of Porto Rico
- Party: Union of Puerto Rico
- Profession: Politician

Mariano Abril y Ostalo (1861–1935) was a Puerto Rican politician, historian, journalist, and poet. Abril served as a member of the Senate and as the Official Historian of Puerto Rico.

== Early years and work ==
Mariano Abril y Ostalo was born on 25 May 1861 in San Juan, Captaincy General of Puerto Rico (present-day, Puerto Rico).

During his youth, he worked as a notary clerk while writing for El Palenque de la Juventud under the pseudonym of "Florete". In 1888, he founded La Linterna, a magazine that was censored by the government. He then worked for El Clamor del País, a San Juan political newspaper. He also collaborated for La Democracia, another newspaper which he ended up directing in 1895.

== Exile in Europe ==
In 1896, after attacking the government in his newspaper, he was convicted to prison by a War Council. However, he fled to France where he stayed for a while. He then moved to Madrid, where he was detained and jailed for several months. After receiving a pardon from the Ministry of Overseas, Don Antonio Cánovas del Castillo, he remained in Madrid for three years collaborating for the newspapers El Globo, Heraldo de Madrid, and El Liberal.

== Return to Puerto Rico and political career ==
Abril y Ostalo then moved to Venezuela and then to United States. When the Spanish–American War ended in 1898, he returned to Puerto Rico and joined Luis Muñoz Rivera in his political fight. He became a member of the Puerto Rico House of Representatives in 1904, and then of the first Senate of Puerto Rico in 1917, representing the District of Guayama. He was again reelected in 1920, this time as a Senator at-large.

== Writings and later years ==
Abril continued to collaborate with newspapers and magazines like Revista de las Antillas, Puerto Rico Ilustrado, and El Mundo, as well as the Cuban publication Las Antillas. He also wrote poems which were compiled in the 1900 book Amorosas. Other of his books were Sensaciones de un cronista (1903) and Un héroe de la independencia de España y América: Antonio Valero de Bernabé (1929).

Abril y Ostalo was the first president of the Puerto Rican Academy of History and since 1931 served as Official Historian of Puerto Rico, until his death on December 5, 1935. He is buried at Puerto Rico Memorial Cemetery in Carolina, Puerto Rico.

Political offices
Preceded by Cayetano Coll y Toste	Official Historian of Puerto Rico; 1931–1935	Succeeded by Adolfo de Hostos
