= Salvador Brau =

Puerto Rican writer and historian (1842–1912)

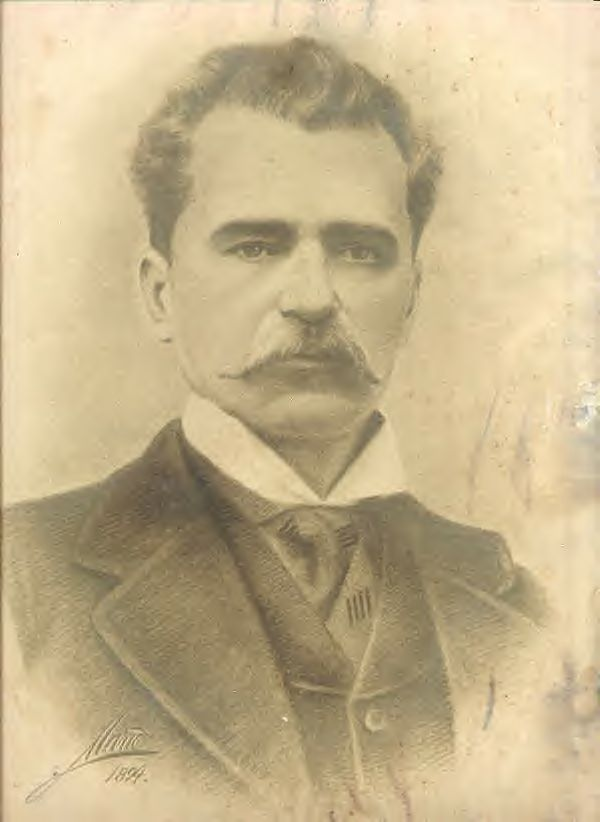
- Brau in 1894

Official Historian of Puerto Rico
- In office 1908–1912
- Preceded by: Francisco Mariano Quiñones
- Succeeded by: Cayetano Coll y Toste

Personal details
- Born: Salvador Brau y Asencio; January 11, 1842 Cabo Rojo, Puerto Rico
- Died: November 5, 1912 (aged 70) San Juan, Puerto Rico
- Education: University of Barcelona (BLitt, D.Litt.)
- Occupation: journalist, poet, dramatist, novelist, historian, and sociologist.

Salvador Brau y Asencio (January 11, 1842 – November 5, 1912) was a Puerto Rican journalist, poet, dramatist, novelist, historian, and sociologist. He was designated the official historian of Puerto Rico by the first American-appointed governor of the island.

== Early years ==
Brau was born in Cabo Rojo, Puerto Rico, into a well-to-do family. His father was Bartolomé Brau, a Catalan teacher, and his mother was Luisa Asencio, a native of Venezuela. Brau received his primary and secondary education in private schools. Forced to work to care for his family after the death of his father in about 1855, he began to teach himself. By the age of 16, he was composing various literary works and with his friends started a theatrical society. He wished to continue his education in an institute of higher learning and thus went to Spain in 1861 where he attended the University of Barcelona, earning a degree in Letters. During his stay in the mother country, he came into contact with the autonomist movement of Puerto Rico and became involved. Eventually, Brau earned his Doctorate in Letters.

== Important discoveries ==
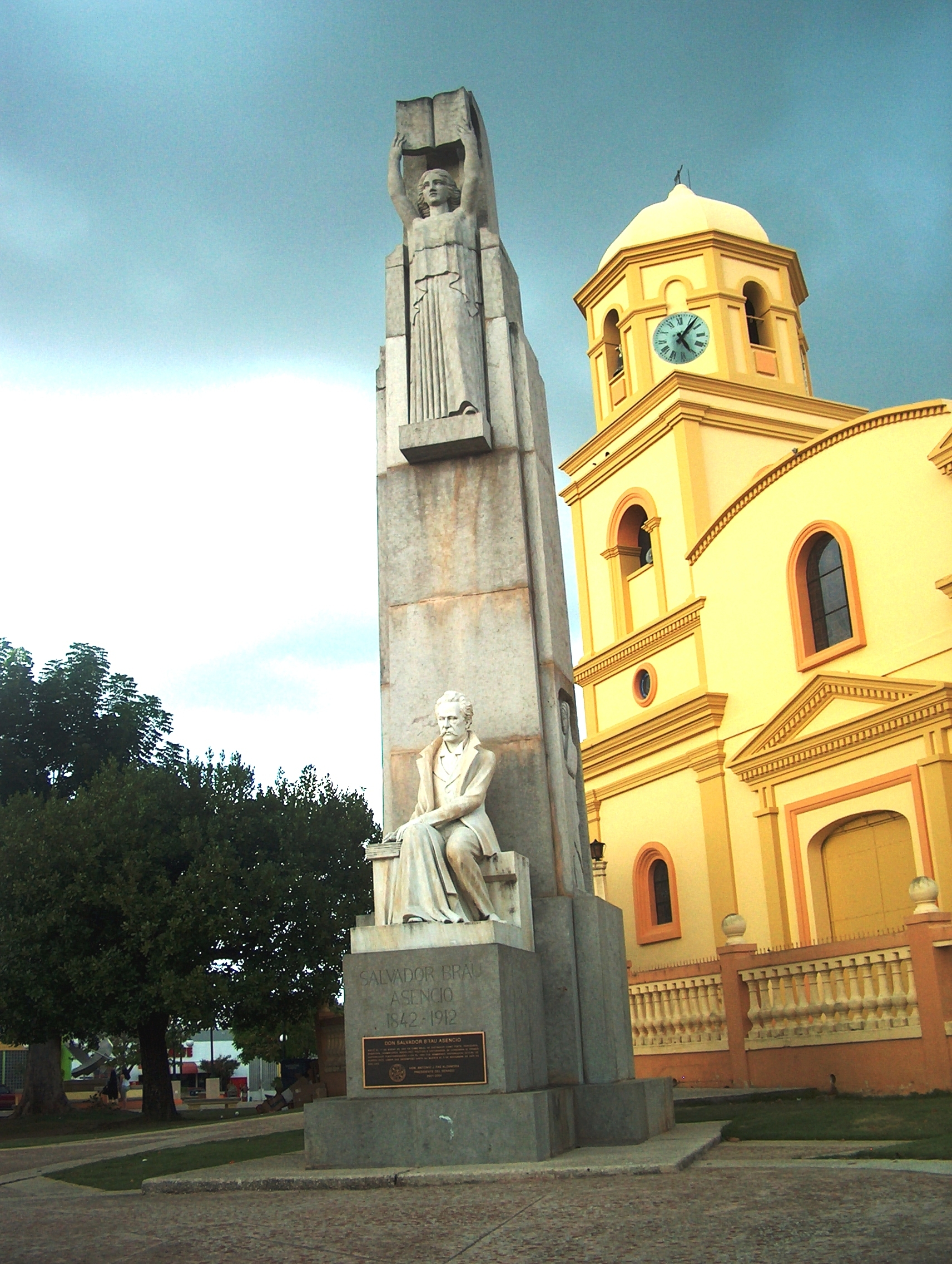
Monument to Brau in Cabo Rojo in front of San Miguel Arcángel Church, 2007

In 1870, Brau returned to Puerto Rico and became a journalist. He joined the Autonomist Party of Puerto Rico and became politically active, believing that Puerto Rico should be granted more powers by the Spanish Crown. He expressed his beliefs in his novels and plays, including one of his most acclaimed plays, "La Vuelta al Hogar" (Once on This Island).

In 1894, Brau was named Commissioner for the Provincial Deputation. He then moved back to Spain where he investigated the historical documents pertaining to Puerto Rico's past. These documents were stored and continue to be stored in the Indias Archives of Seville. In 1897, after three years of investigating the historical documents, Brau returned to Puerto Rico.

His findings in Seville included documents written by Fray Antonio de Montesinos, Fray Íñigo Abad y Lasierra and others. He uncovered important information about how the Taínos lived and how they were treated harshly by the Spanish settlers. During his investigation he found an interesting reference to the Puerto Rican danza. According to a document written by Fray Íñigo Abad y Lasierra, Bishop of Puerto Rico (1772–1778), there was a typical, fast and noisy shoe-stomping dance in the island which he called "Puerto Rican danza". Brau, however, claims that the authentic Puerto Rican danza was a popular creation that emerged in the 19th century.

== Official Historian of Puerto Rico ==
In 1898, Puerto Rico became a colonial possession of the United States after the Spanish–American War in accordance with the Treaty of Paris. Brau continued to be politically active and in 1903 was named Official Historian of Puerto Rico by the American-appointed governor William Henry Hunt. He held this position until his death on November 5, 1912, in San Juan, Puerto Rico. He was interred in Santa María Magdalena de Pazzis Cemetery in Old San Juan.

== Written works ==
A partial list of Brau's written works:

- 1892 - Puerto Rico y su historia [Puerto Rico and its history] (Puerto Rico: Tip. de Arturo Cordova)
- 1904 - Historia de Puerto Rico [History of Puerto Rico] (New York: D. Appleton & Co.)
- 1907 - La Colonizacion de Puerto Rico [The Colonization of Puerto Rico] (San Juan: Tip. del “Heraldo Español”)
- 1909 - La fundación de Ponce: estudio retrospectivo que comprende desde los asomos de vecindad europea en las riberas del Portugués, al terminar el siglo XVI, hasta el incendio casi total del pueblo de Ponce en febrero de 1820. (Ponce: Tipografia "La Democracia")
- ¿Pecadora? (a novel)

== Legacy ==
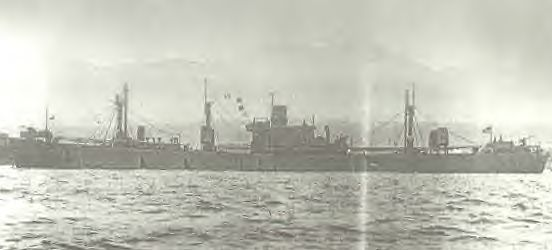
SS Salvador Brau

The town of San Juan honored him with a park and a statue. The town of Cabo Rojo has honored his memory with a monument and by naming a hall in its amphitheater after him. The town of Aguada has a bust of Brau in its plaza. Brau was one of the few Puerto Ricans to be honored by the United States Maritime Commission when during World War II the Liberty ship SS Salvador Brau was built in Panama City, Florida, and named in his honor.

== See also ==
- List of Puerto Ricans
- German immigration to Puerto Rico

Political offices
Preceded by Francisco Mariano Quiñones	Official Historian of Puerto Rico; 1908–1912	Succeeded by Cayetano Coll y Toste
