= Luis González Vales =

Puerto Rican historian (1930–2023)

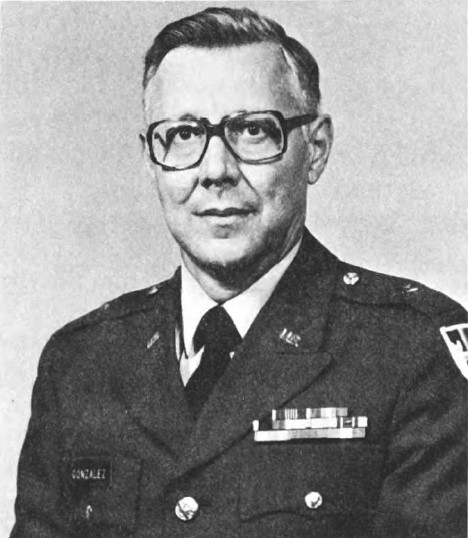
- González Vales as a Brigadier General
- Born: May 11, 1930; Rio Piedras, Puerto Rico
- Died: October 21, 2023 (aged 93)
- Burial place: Puerto Rico National Cemetery in Bayamón, Puerto Rico
- Military career
- Allegiance: United States of America
- Branch: United States Army Reserve United States Army Army National Guard
- Service years: 1952–1985
- Rank: Major General
- Commands: 92nd Infantry Brigade (Separate), Adjutant General of the Puerto Rico National Guard
- Awards: Army Distinguished Service Medal

Luis Ernesto González Vales (May 11, 1930 – October 21, 2023) was a Puerto Rican historian. He held the post of Official Historian of Puerto Rico, having succeeded Pilar Barbosa.

== Education ==
A graduate of Bachelor of Arts with a concentration in history from the University of Puerto Rico, González Vales obtained his master's degree from the Columbia University of New York, where he also carried out doctoral courses. He was Professor of history of the University of Puerto Rico and Associate Dean of the Faculty of General Studies of the Río Piedras campus from the University of Puerto Rico. He held the position of Executive Secretary of the Board of higher education, and he was appointed by the Legislative Assembly of Puerto Rico and the Governor as official historian of Puerto Rico.

== Military career ==
González Vales, a military historian, started his military career on May 31, 1952, as a second lieutenant in the United States Army Reserve through the Army ROTC program, on March 10, 1952, went to active duty in the United States Army with the 296 regiment and later on to Germany assigned to the 12th Infantry Regiment, 4th Infantry Division. He joined the Puerto Rico National Guard in 1955 and became a platoon leader in the 295th Infantry Regiment. He served as liaison officer and platoon leader with the 1st battalion 101st Cavalry Regiment in the New York National Guard in 1963. He returned to the Puerto Rico National Guard in September 1964 assigned to the 65th Infantry Regiment, 1st Battalion in Cayey, Puerto Rico. He served from 1971 to 1979 in the United States Army Reserve to command a unit of the Industrial College of the Armed Forces at Fort Buchanan, Puerto Rico. He returned to the Puerto Rico National Guard in 1979 and became Assistant Adjutant General. He graduated at the United States Army Command and General Staff College. In 1983 he was appointed Adjutant General of the Puerto Rico National Guard by governor Carlos Romero Barceló. As Adjutant General, González Vale bade farewell to Pope John Paul II as he departed Muñiz Air National Guard Base, Puerto Rico on October 12, 1984. Along with Cardinal Luis Aponte Martínez, he was the keynote speaker at a Puerto Rico Department of State exhibition in March–April 2009 of memorabilia of the Pope's visit to Puerto Rico. Retired from the military in 1985 after 33 years of service.

As a professor at the University of Puerto Rico, he also held administrative posts in the 1990s.

González Vales hosted a major international convention of historians in April, 2008 in San Juan, Puerto Rico.

González Vales chaired the Quincentennial of the Governorship of Puerto Rico Committee which restored the Juan Ponce de León monument in Old San Juan, held an event on January 21, 2011, at Santervás del Campo, Spain, the birthplace of Puerto Rico's first Governor, where a similar monument was unveiled, and organized several other academic events to commemorate the institution of the Governorship of Puerto Rico.

== Death ==
Luis González Vales died on October 21, 2023, at the age of 93.

== Awards and decorations ==
Among BG Luis González Vales's military decorations were the following:

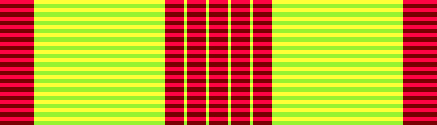

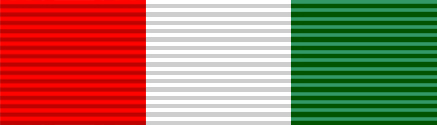

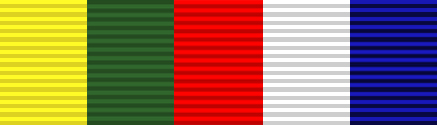

Army Distinguished Service Medal	Army Commendation Medal	Army Reserve Components Achievement Medal with two bronce oak leaf clusters
Army of Occupation Medal	Armed Forces Reserve Medal with gold Hourglass Device	National Defense Service Medal
Puerto Rico Commendation Medal	Puerto Rico Service Medal	Puerto Rico VIII Pan-American Games Support Ribbon

== Promotions ==
Insignia	Rank	Year
	Major General	1983
	Brigadier General	1979
	Colonel	1973
	Lieutenant Colonel	1968
	Major	1962
	Captain	1957
	First Lieutenant	1953
	Second Lieutenant	1951

Political offices
Preceded by Pilar Barbosa	Official Historian of Puerto Rico; 1997–2023	Succeeded by Carlos I. Hernández-Hernández
Military offices
Preceded by Major General Orlando Llenza	Adjutant General of the Puerto Rico National Guard; Under Governor Carlos Romero Barceló; 1983–1985	Succeeded by Major General Alfredo J. Mora
