= Cayetano Coll y Toste =

Puerto Rican historian and writer (1850–1930)

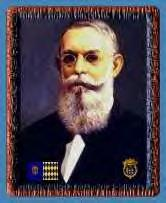
- Cayetano Coll y Toste
- Born: November 30, 1850; Arecibo, Captaincy General of Puerto Rico, Spanish Empire
- Died: November 19, 1930 (aged 79); Madrid, Kingdom of Spain
- Education: University of Barcelona, 1872
- Occupations: Physician; historian; writer
- Spouse: Adela Cuchí y Arnau (died 1926)
- Children: 6 including, José Coll y Cuchí; Cayetano Coll y Cuchí
- Relatives: Isabel Cuchí Coll (granddaughter); Conchita Cuchí Coll (granddaughter); Edna Coll (granddaughter); Fufi Santori (great-grandson)

Cayetano Coll y Toste (November 30, 1850 – November 19, 1930), was a Puerto Rican physician, historian and writer, who served as Official Historian of Puerto Rico from 1913 until his death in 1930. He was the founder and editor of the fourteen volumes of the “Historical Bulletin of Puerto Rico.” He was the patriarch of a prominent family of Puerto Rican educators, politicians and writers.

== Early years ==
Coll y Toste was born on November 30, 1850, in Arecibo, Captaincy General of Puerto Rico (present-day Puerto Rico). Coll's father was born in Spain and his mother, Monserrate Toste Torres de Coll Bassa (c. 1824–1914), was born in Puerto Rico.

In 1863, he entered the Jesuits' Seminary College in San Juan from where he graduated with a bachelor's degree in Philosophy in 1868. In 1872, Coll y Toste went to Barcelona, Spain and enrolled in the "School of Medicine" of the University of Barcelona. From here he graduated as a "Doctor in Medicine and Surgery" in 1872. During his stay in Spain, he was able to study historical documents relating to Puerto Rico which he later found to be useful to him.

== Historian ==
In 1874, Coll y Toste returned to the island where he set up his own medical practice in Arecibo. In 1891, he was named director of the Catholic Hospital of Arecibo. In his free time, he developed both a love of and an interest in literature. Not only did he become interested in investigating the history of Puerto Rico, but, he also took an active interest in the island's politics and was the founder and director of a publication called "El Ramillete". He also collaborated with the "Revista Puertorriqueña" (Puerto Rican Review), "La Semana Politica" (Political Weekly) and "Plumas Amigas" (Pen Pals).

== Political activity ==
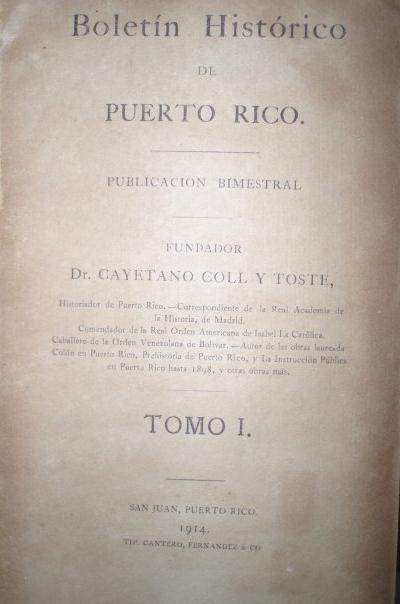
First Volume of the Boletin Historico de Puerto Rico, 1914

In 1897, a year before the Spanish–American War, Coll y Toste was Sub-Secretary of Agriculture and Commerce and was named Regional Governor of Northern Puerto Rico by the Spanish Crown. After the war, Coll y Toste was named Civil Secretary and in 1900 Commissioner of the Interior by General Davis the military governor appointed by the United States. He held the position of Secretary of the Government and he also became a delegate to Puerto Rico's House of Representatives. In 1913 Coll y Toste was named Official Historian of Puerto Rico, preceded by Salvador Brau. Among Coll y Toste's other civil positions were the Presidency of the Puerto Rican Historical Academy and of the Ateneo Puertorriqueño.

== Written works ==
Among his many written works are:

- El Boletin Historico de Puerto Rico (Historical Bulletin of Puerto Rico)
- Cronicas de Arecibo (Arecibo Annals)
- Leyendas y Tradiciones Puertorriqueñas (Puerto Rican Legends and Traditions)

His research into the history of Puerto Rico gave people an insight into the island from the pre-Columbian era up until 1927. One of his works, The Indo-Antillean Vocabulary, is valuable in understanding the way of life of the Indigenous peoples of the Caribbean. His works are required reading in Puerto Rican high schools and universities.

Coll y Toste did not use the term "Taino" to refer to the Indigenous peoples of the Greater Antilles. In his Prehistory of Puerto Rico, Coll y Toste wrote that some scholars used the term, but that he found "no scientific basis for this" stating his view that "Indo-Antilleans were Arawaks, and having lost the memory of their origin, they should be called...siboneyes, haytianos, jamaiquinos and boriqueños, because over time they had acquired their own personality."

== Later years ==
Coll was married to Adela Cuchí y Arnau, daughter of José Cuchí y Arnau former mayor of Arecibo. Together they had six children, among them José Coll y Cuchí, who founded the Puerto Rican Nationalist Party and Cayetano Coll y Cuchí, who was a President of Puerto Rico House of Representatives. Adela Cuchí y Arnau died in 1926.

Spain bestowed upon Coll y Toste the title of "Comendador de la Real Orden Americana de Isabel la Catolica" (Knight of the American Royal Order of Isabel the Catholic) and the Government of Venezuela honored Coll y Toste with the title of "Caballero de la Orden de Bolivar" (Knight of the Order of Bolivar). Cayetano Coll y Toste died on November 19, 1930, in the City of Madrid. His granddaughter, Isabel Cuchí Coll, who was an author and the director of the "Sociedad de Autores Puertorriqueños" (Society of Puerto Rican Authors), published his work "Historia de la esclavitud en Puerto Rico (información y documentos)" (History of Slavery in Puerto Rico (documents and information)) in 1972.

== Family ==
Coll y Toste was also the patriarch of a Puerto Rican family of educators, politicians and writers. Besides his granddaughter, Isabel Cuchí Coll, both Coll y Toste's sons were politicians. José Coll y Cuchí was the founder of the Puerto Rican Nationalist Party and Cayetano Coll y Cuchí, was a President of Puerto Rico House of Representatives. Another grand daughter, Edna Coll, was an educator and author. She was one of the founders of the Academy of Fine Arts in Puerto Rico, and his grandson, Cayetano Coll y Pujol was a prominent attorney and judge in Puerto Rico. Isabel's sister Conchita Cuchí Coll de Carlo was an essayist and pacifist nominated for the Nobel Peace Prize. His great-grandson, (Edna's son), Jose "Fufi" Santori Coll was a former BSN basketball player, coach and television sportscaster. Another great-grandson, Eduardo Morales Coll was also President of the Ateneo, President of the Institute of Puerto Rican Literature, Academic of the Puerto Rican Academy of the Spanish Language and also an Academic of the Puerto Rican Academy of Arts and Sciences and a university professor of law, History of Puerto Rico and of Cultural Anthropology.

== Legacy ==
Puerto Rico has honored his memory by naming many public buildings and an avenue after him. The government named the public Arecibo regional hospital Hospital Regional Cayetano Coll y Toste.

== See also ==
- List of Puerto Ricans
- Arasibo

Political offices
Preceded by Salvador Brau	Official Historian of Puerto Rico; 1913–1930	Succeeded by Mariano Abril y Ostalo
