= José Coll y Cuchí =

Puerto Rican politician and independence advocate (1877–1960)

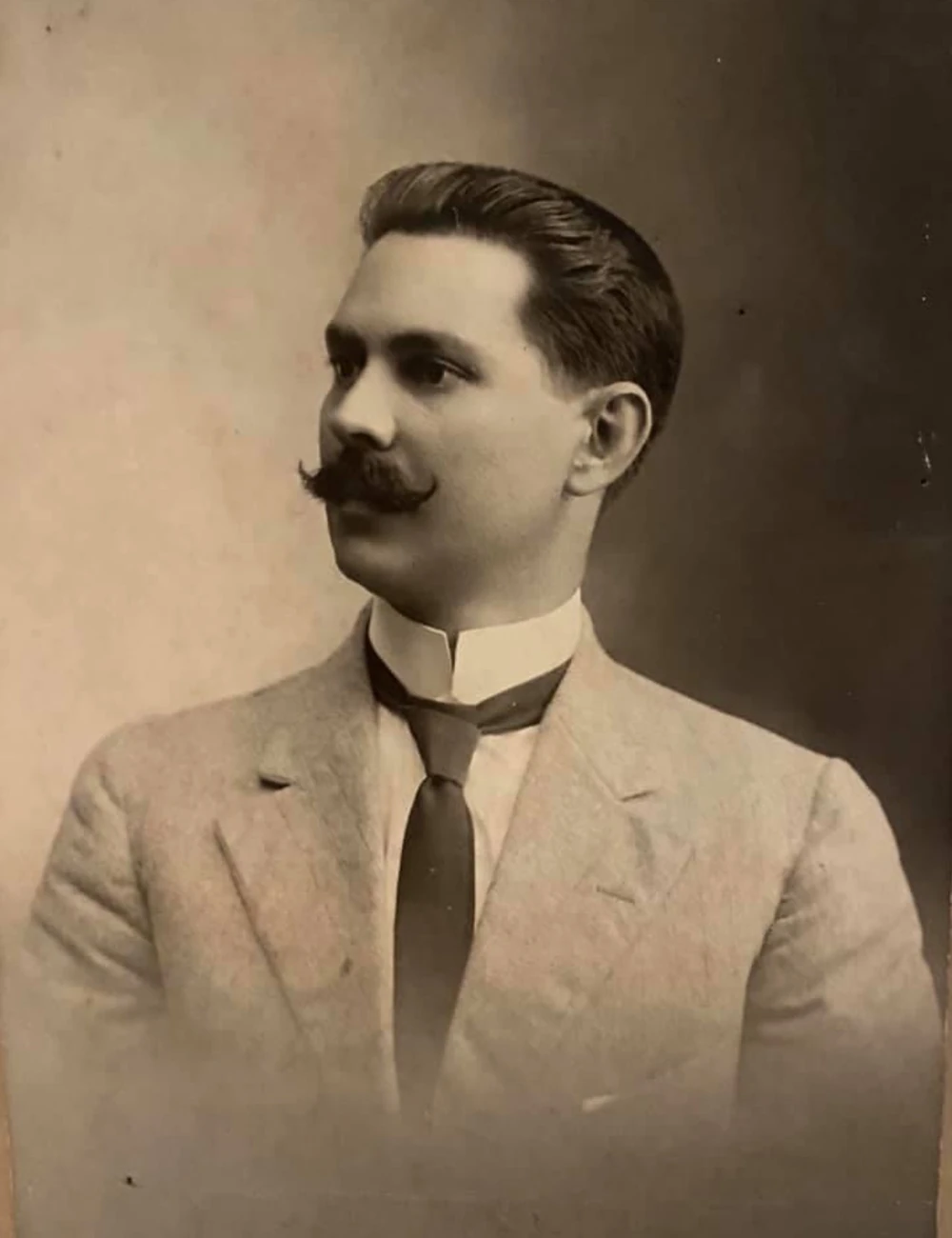
- Founder of the Puerto Rican Nationalist Party
- Born: January 12, 1877; Arecibo, Puerto Rico
- Died: July 2, 1960 (aged 83); Santurce, Puerto Rico
- Political party: Puerto Rican Nationalist Party
- Movement: Puerto Rican Independence
- Spouse: Josefina Moya
- Children: 9

José Coll y Cuchí (January 12, 1877 – July 2, 1960) was a lawyer, writer and the founder of the Puerto Rican Nationalist Party. He was a member of a Puerto Rican family of politicians, educators and writers. (Note: See: "Notable family members" section)

== Early years ==
Coll y Cuchí was born in Arecibo, Puerto Rico. His father was Cayetano Coll y Toste, a historian who in 1913 was named the "Official Historian of Puerto Rico" and his mother Adela, was the daughter of José Cuchí y Arnau former mayor of Arecibo. His family sent him to private schools for his primary and secondary education. In 1896, Coll y Cuchí's family sent him to Spain where he earned his degree in law from the University of Barcelona. During his stay in Spain, he became interested in politics and became involved with the Puerto Rico's independence movement.

When Coll y Cuchí returned to Puerto Rico, he found himself with a totally different political situation. The island, which once belonged to the Spanish Crown, was now a territory of the United States. This came about as part of the Treaty of Paris as a consequence of the outcome of the Spanish–American War.

== Politician ==
In 1904, he joined the Puerto Rican Republican Party and was elected to the Puerto Rican Chamber of Delegates. Believing that Puerto Rico's identity as a nation was threatened by the Foraker Law, he decided to join the Puerto Rican Union Party headed by Antonio R. Barceló and was re-elected to the Chamber of Delegates in 1908. As member of the Chamber, he led the fight against the Foraker Law, also known as the Organic Act of 1900, which established a civilian government in the island. The new government had an American governor and executive council appointed by the President of the United States.

By 1919, Coll y Cuchí felt that the Union Party wasn't doing enough for the cause of Puerto Rico and together with some followers departed from the party and formed the Nationalist Association of Puerto Rico in San Juan. By the 1920s there were two other pro-independence organizations in the Island: the Nationalist Youth and the Independence Association. The Independence Association was founded by José S. Alegría, Eugenio Font Suárez and Dr. Leopoldo Figueroa in 1920. Under Coll y Cuchi's presidency, the party was able to convince the Puerto Rican Legislature Assembly to approve an act that would permit the transfer of the mortal remains of Puerto Rican patriot Ramón Emeterio Betances from Paris, France, to Puerto Rico. Betances' remains arrived in San Juan, Puerto Rico, on August 5, 1920, and a funeral caravan organized by the Nationalist Association transferred the remains from the capital to the town of Cabo Rojo where his ashes were interred by his monument.

== Founding of the Puerto Rican Nationalist Party ==
On September 17, 1922, the three political organizations joined forces and formed the Puerto Rican Nationalist Party. Coll y Cuchí was elected president, José S. Alegría (father of Ricardo Alegría) vice-president and Antonio Vélez Alvarado "The Father of the Puerto Rican Flag" to the party's Supreme Counsel. In 1924 Dr. Pedro Albizu Campos joined the party and was named vice-president.

In 1927, Coll y Cuchí was invited to Columbia University to give a conference. At that conference the governor of New York Al Smith was present and congratulated Coll y Cuchí. When Smith ran for President of the U.S. in 1928, under the democratic ticket, he invited Coll y Cuchí to come to the U.S. and campaign for him among the Hispanic communities, which he did. The Nationalist Party did poorly in the 1928 elections, they only received 399 votes out of a total of 253,520 votes.

Despite the fact that he was a leader in the independence movement, Coll y Cuchí displayed respect and admiration towards the Americans. Albizu Campos did not like what he considered was Coll y Cuchí's attitude of fraternal solidarity with the enemy. By 1930, there were more disagreements between Coll y Cuchí and Albizu Campos as to how the party should be run. As a result, Coll y Cuchí abandoned the party and some of his followers returned to the Union Party. On May 11, 1930, Albizu Campos was elected president of the Puerto Rican Nationalist Party. In 1931, when President Herbert Hoover visited Puerto Rico, Coll y Cuchí urged the islanders to greet him with a warm welcome.

== Notable family members ==
Coll y Cuchí came from a family of Puerto Rican educators, politicians and writers. His father Dr. Cayetano Coll y Toste (1850–1930), was a historian and writer. His brother Cayetano Coll y Cuchí, was a President of Puerto Rico House of Representatives. His niece Edna Coll was an educator and author who founded the Academy of Fine Arts in Puerto Rico and his nieces Isabel Cuchí Coll was a journalist, author and the Director of the "Sociedad de Autores Puertorriqueños" (Society of Puerto Rican Authors), and Conchita Cuchí Coll de Carlo was an essayist and pacifist nominated for the Nobel Peace Prize. His nephew (Edna's son) Jose "Fufi" Santori Coll is a former BSN basketball player, coach and television sportscaster. His grandson, attorney at law Eduardo Morales Coll, was President of the Puerto Rican Atheneum for 30 consecutive years, also President of the Institute of Puerto Rican Literature for 20 consecutive years, is an Academic of the Puerto Rican Academy of the Spanish language, also an Academic of the Puerto Rican Academy of Arts and Sciences, among other cultural institutions.

== Later years ==
Coll y Cuchí was director of Puerto Rican Athaeneum's Political Sciences Section. He is the only Puerto Rican to have received the Medal of Honor from Spain's "Royal Academy of the Spanish Language" for the best book published during a five-year span. Coll y Cuchí never abandoned his pro-independence ideals and continued to be active in the independence cause. José Coll y Cuchí died in Santurce, Puerto Rico on July 2, 1960.

== Written works ==
Among his written works are the following:

- The Secular Issues of the Jewish People
- America's Doctrine
- Nationalism in Puerto Rico (1923)

== See also ==
- List of Puerto Ricans
- Puerto Rican Nationalist Party
- Ponce massacre
- Río Piedras massacre
- Utuado uprising
- Truman assassination attempt
- Puerto Rican Independence Party
- History of Puerto Rico
