= Adolfo de Hostos =

Puerto Rican historian

Official Historian of Puerto Rico
- In office 1936–1950
- Preceded by: Mariano Abril y Ostalo
- Succeeded by: Pilar Barbosa de Rosario

Personal details
- Born: Adolfo José de Hostos y de Ayala; January 8, 1887 Santo Domingo, Second Dominican Republic
- Died: October 29, 1982 (aged 95) San Juan, Puerto Rico
- Spouses: Rosenda Brunet Guayta (m. 1914; died 1945) María Asunción Olivar Piñero (m. 1948)
- Children: 2
- Parents: Eugenio María de Hostos (father); Belinda Otilia de Ayala y Quintana (mother)
- Occupation: Historian; archaeologist

Military service
- Allegiance: United States
- Branch/service: United States Army
- Years of service: 1905–1919
- Rank: First lieutenant

Adolfo de Hostos (1887–1982) was a Dominican-born Puerto Rican historian and archaeologist, known for serving as the fifth Official Historian of Puerto Rico.

== Early life ==
Adolfo José de Hostos y de Ayala was born on January 8, 1887 in Santo Domingo, Second Dominican Republic (present-day, Dominican Republic) to Eugenio María de Hostos and Belinda Otilia de Ayala y Quintana. de Hostos was baptised on July 23, 1887 in San Carlos, and had five brothers and sisters.

In 1939, he corresponded with his brother Eugenio Carlos de Hostos excitedly relaying how he hoped to have his publication, Trópico, be included in the newspaper Puerto Rico Ilustrado.

== Military career ==
De Hostos served in the United States Army from 1905-1919 rising to the rank of 1st lieutenant. He was as military aide to Gov. Arthur Yeager before his appointment by Gov. Blanton Winship.

== Official historian ==
His most prominent publication is "Ciudad Murada", the history of the city of San Juan, Puerto Rico, the United States' oldest city.

After his retirement in 1950, the position of Official Historian remained vacant for 43 years, until the Puerto Rico House of Representatives approved in 1993 Senate Concurrent Resolution 14, authored by Sen. Kenneth McClintock, designated Dr. Pilar Barbosa.

De Hostos spearheaded the excavation at a location in Guaynabo, finding remnants of early European settlement in Puerto Rico. The location is now called the Caparra Archaeological Site.

De Hostos made an important contribution to pre-Columbian archaeology with his book titled "Anthropological Papers: Based Principally on Studies of the Prehistoric Archaeology and Ethnology of the Greater Antilles" published in 1941.

== Personal life ==
In 1914, de Hostos married Rosenda Brunet Guayta (1887–1945), with whom he had two children. In 1948, de Hostos married María Asunción Olivar Piñero (1927–2020).

de Hostos died on October 29, 1982, in San Juan, Puerto Rico.

Political offices
Preceded by Mariano Abril y Ostalo	Official Historian of Puerto Rico; 1936–1950	Succeeded by Pilar Barbosa
