= Official Historian of Puerto Rico =

Chief Historian of the Office of the Official Historian of Puerto Rico

Office of the Official Historian of Puerto Rico
- Oficina del Historiador Oficial de Puerto Rico

Agency overview
- Formed: March 12, 1903; 123 years ago
- Jurisdiction: Office of Legislative Services of Puerto Rico
- Headquarters: FV8H+XXR, C. Beneficencia, San Juan, 00901, Puerto Rico
- Agency executive: Carlos I. Hernández-Hernández, Official Historian of Puerto Rico
- Website: www.oslpr.org/about-5

The Official Historian of Puerto Rico (Spanish: Historiador Oficial de Puerto Rico) is the Chief Historian of the Office of the Official Historian of Puerto Rico, and is tasked with preserving the history of the Commonwealth of Puerto Rico.

== History ==
Pursuant to a law approved on March 12, 1903 "An Act for the Approval and Conservation of Certain Historical Data of Puerto Rico", the Puerto Rico Legislature created the Office of the Official Historian of Puerto Rico (Spanish: Oficina del Historiador Oficial de Puerto Rico).

The historians who held the position during the early decades of the 20th century included Francisco Mariano Quiñones, Salvador Brau y Asencio, Dr. Cayetano Coll y Toste, Mariano Abril and Adolfo de Hostos. The office remained vacant until 1993, when then Sen. Kenneth McClintock authored a measure to reestablish the office. Upon its approval, Senate President Roberto Rexach Benítez and House Speaker Zaida Hernández Torres appointed Dr. Pilar Barbosa as the first Official Historian in the office's "modern era". The first woman to hold the job, she held it until her death in 1997. At that time, Senate President Charlie Rodríguez and House Speaker Edison Misla Aldarondo appointed Dr. Luis González Vale.

== Organization ==
The Office of the Official Historian is part of the Office of Legislative Services of Puerto Rico (Spanish: Oficina de Servicios Legislativos de Puerto Rico), and reports to the speakers of the House and Senate.

== Luis González Vale ==
Under Vale's leadership, the office collaborated on multiple publications, including the letters of Resident Commissioner Félix Córdova Dávila, and several works regarding Puerto Rico's military history. In 2005, in collaboration with Puerto Rico's Endowment for the Humanities and the National Endowment for the Humanities, his office published an eight-book "We, the People" Puerto Rican Series of books regarding the history of Puerto Rico during the first 30 years of US sovereignty.

Dr. González Vale was invited to testify as a non-partisan witness at hearings held by the U.S. House of Representatives Subcommittee on Insular Affairs on legislation regarding Puerto Rico's future political relationship with the United States. Luis González Vales died on October 23, 2023, at the age of 93.

== Official historian ==
- Francisco Mariano Quiñones (1903-1908)
- Salvador Brau (1908-1912)
- Cayetano Coll y Toste (1913-1930)
- Mariano Abril y Ostalo (1931-1935)
- Adolfo de Hostos (1936-1950)
- Pilar Barbosa (1993-1997)
- Luis González Vales (1997-2023)
- Carlos I. Hernández-Hernández (2024-)
