= Francisco Mariano Quiñones =

Puerto Rican abolitionist (1830–1908)

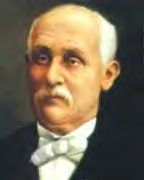

Official Historian of Puerto Rico
- In office 1903–1908
- Succeeded by: Salvador Brau

Personal details
- Born: Francisco Mariano Quiñones Y Quiñones; 14 February 1830 San Germán, Captaincy General of Puerto Rico, Spanish Empire
- Died: 13 September 1908 (aged 78) San Germán, Insular Government of Porto Rico
- Party: Liberal Reformist Party (1848–1887); Autonomist Party (1887–1898); Republican Party of Puerto Rico (1898–1908)
- Occupation: Politician; abolitionist; historian

Francisco Mariano Quiñones y Quiñones (1830–1908) was a Puerto Rican politician, abolitionist, historian and proponent of Puerto Rican self-determination. Quiñones was the President of Puerto Rico's first Cabinet and the first Official Historian of Puerto Rico.

== Early years and education ==
Francisco Mariano Quiñones y Quiñones was born on 14 February 1830 in San Germán, Puerto Rico, Captaincy General of Puerto Rico (present-day Puerto Rico) into a family of wealthy landowners. Quiñones developed his lifelong love for literature and journalism at a young age. He was sent to Europe where he attended private schools. After he finished his secondary education, he went on to university studies in Bremen, Germany; France, and New York City. When Quiñones returned to Puerto Rico in 1848, he went to work for the family business.

== Career ==
=== Abolitionist ===
In 1865, the Spanish Crown requested from the municipalities of Puerto Rico recommendations for new laws and Quiñones was elected representative for San Germán. In 1867, Quiñones represented Puerto Rico before the "Overseas Information Committee" meeting in Spain. Together with Segundo Ruiz Belvis and José Julián Acosta, he demanded the abolition of slavery in Puerto Rico and also protested over the injustices practiced by the governor General Romualdo Palacio González in the island.

=== Politician ===
When Quiñones returned to the island, he joined the Liberal Reformist Party and in 1871 was elected as representative in front of the Spanish Courts. In Spain he continued his fight for the abolition of slavery.

In 1887, Quiñones joined the Autonomist Party headed by Luis Muñoz Rivera. There were some disagreements between Muñoz and some of the members which led to a rupture in the party. Among those who abandoned the party were Quiñones and José Celso Barbosa, who went on to form the Orthodox Autonomist Party.

On 10 February 1898, Spain granted Puerto Rico the rights to self-determination, which was considered the first step towards independence. Quiñones was named President of Puerto Rico's first Cabinet by General Macías.

In 1898, after the Spanish–American War when Puerto Rico became a colonial territory of the United States, Quiñones joined the Republican Party of Puerto Rico founded by Celso Barbosa and which championed the idea of converting Puerto Rico into a state of the U.S. Quiñones was elected and served as a representative in the House of Delegates in 1900 and 1902 Mayor of San Germán.

== Personal life ==
Quiñones was married to Concepción Quiñones y Silva.

Quiñones died on 13 September 13 1908 in San Germán aged 78. A private mourning held following day on the house floor was attended by Muñoz, José de Diego, Rosendo Matienzo Cintrón, R. Arrillaga, José R. Laurrauri, Pedro F. Colberg, Carlos H. Blondet, and V. Trelles Oliva; a public funeral was held at 7 P.M. He was buried at Cementerio Trujillo in San Germán, Puerto Rico.

== Published works ==
Among his most important written works of literature are Artículos (1887) and Apuntes para la Historia de Puerto Rico (1888).

== See also ==
- List of Puerto Ricans

Political offices
New creation	Official Historian of Puerto Rico; 1903–1908	Succeeded by Salvador Brau
