= Fufi Santori =

Puerto Rican basketball player and coach

Personal information
- Born: May 7, 1932 Santurce, Puerto Rico
- Died: April 2, 2018 (aged 85) Hato Rey, Puerto Rico
- Listed height: 5 ft 10 in (1.78 m)
- Listed weight: 161 lb (73 kg)

Career information
- Playing career: 1951–1961
- Position: Point guard
- Coaching career: 1962–1972

Career history

Playing
- 1951: Cangrejeros de Santurce
- 1952-1953: Gallitos de la UPR
- 1954: Cangrejeros Santurce
- 1955–1961: Capitanes de Arecibo

Coaching
- 1962: Cangrejeros de Santurce
- 1967-1972: Vaqueros de Bayamón
- 1967-1969: Puerto Rico National Team

Career highlights
- BSN champion (1959); BSN Most Valuable Player (1953); BSN scoring champion (1953); BSN Rookie of the Year (1951)

José Santori Coll (May 7, 1932 – April 2, 2018) was a Puerto Rican basketball player and coach. Santori was also, for a short period late in his life, a bachata singer; he recorded an album, named El Sentimiento de Fufi (Fufi's Feeling), which was musically directed by Harry Fraticelli, during 2011.

Born in Santurce, San Juan, Puerto Rico, he was better known as Fufi Santori. Earned an engineering degree from the University of Puerto Rico at Mayagüez. After his retirement from National Superior Basketball Santori became a coach and television sportscaster. He was also a physical education, basketball and tennis instructor at the University of Puerto Rico at Mayagüez for nearly thirty years. Fufi Santori was of Corsican-Puerto Rican descent. He was also, through his maternal grandfather, of Irish descent.

== Early life and basketball ==
Fufi Santori, his brother Tito and the rest of his family moved to San Juan at an early age. He grew up with pro-independence political ideas; his grandfather Cayetano Coll y Cuchí was first Speaker of the House of Representatives and his grand uncle José Coll y Cuchí was the founder of Puerto Rican Nationalist Party. An avid sports fan, Santori was also a member of the Puerto Rican Olympic Basketball Team that participated in the 1960 Summer Olympics in Rome. He was a tennis player and coach.

Santori made his debut in the Baloncesto Superior Nacional (BSN) in 1951 with the Cangrejeros de Santurce. That season he was chosen as the BSN Rookie of the Year after averaging 17.85 points per game. In 1952 he started playing for the Gallitos de la UPR, a team that played for both BSN league and the LAI league at that moment. In 1953 he became the BSN Scoring Champion with 28.3 points per game. With this scoring title he stopped Raúl "Tinajón" Feliciano's five year streak as the BSN Scoring Champion from 1948 to 1952. That same year, Santori won the BSN Most Valuable Player Award. In 1954 he had a second stint with the Cangrejeros de Santurce and a year later Santori joined the BSN's Capitanes de Arecibo, where he gained fame across Puerto Rico as one of the better known professional basketball players of the 1950s and 1960s. He was one of the players that helped Arecibo to become the only team to go undefeated the entire season when the Capitanes won the 1959 BSN national title. He also played for the Rio Piedras squad, winning two scoring titles there, in 1963 and 1968. Santori was later chosen as the 30th best player in Puerto Rican basketball history by a BSN voting panel.

== Santori v. United States ==
Fufi Santori tried, in 1994, to renounce his United States citizenship, aiming at gaining a mostly symbolic but technically possible Puerto Rican citizenship. Santori's request was denied, based on lack of subject-matter jurisdiction. On June 28 of that year, an appeal from Santori's side was denied by the United States district court for the district of Puerto Rico. Santori's request was rejected because 8 U.S.C. § 1481(a)(5) specifically says that renunciations of U.S. citizenship must be made before a U.S. diplomatic or consular officer abroad. Santori's attempt at renunciation was in the form of an affidavit in Lares, Puerto Rico.

Behind the litigation over Santori's nationality status lie some anomalies and peculiarities relating to matters of status in Puerto Rico: Under the Treaty of Paris under which the United States acquired sovereignty over Puerto Rico, Spanish nationals had a right of option. United States nationality (citizenship) is acquired by persons born in Puerto Rico by that Treaty and under statute, and not under the 14th Amendment (8 U.S.C. § 1406, 66 Stat. 237). Finally, U.S. citizens, born or naturalized in Puerto Rico and domiciled and resident there at the time of death, are not subject to U.S. estate tax on Puerto Rican assets: 26 U.S.C. §§ 2208–2209; Rev. Rul. 74-25; TAM 7612220070A; General Counsel Memorandum 36944, Dec. 10, 1976.

== See also ==
- Basketball at the 1960 Summer Olympics
- BSN Most Valuable Player Award
