= Ron del Barrilito =

Oldest rum manufacturer in Puerto Rico

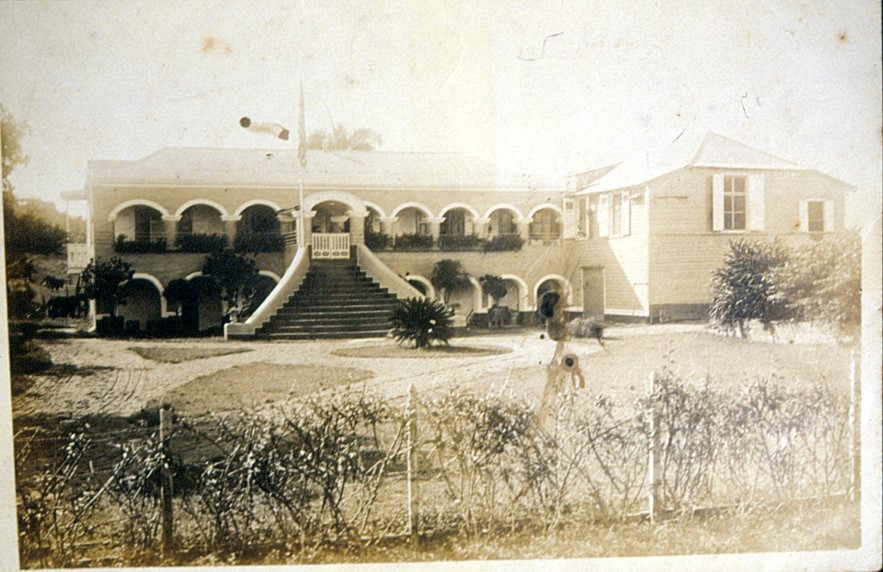
Hacienda Santa Ana in Bayamón, Puerto Rico

Ron del Barrilito is the oldest Puerto Rican rum brand still in production. Since 1880, it has been made by the Fernández family at Hacienda Santa Ana in Bayamón, Puerto Rico.

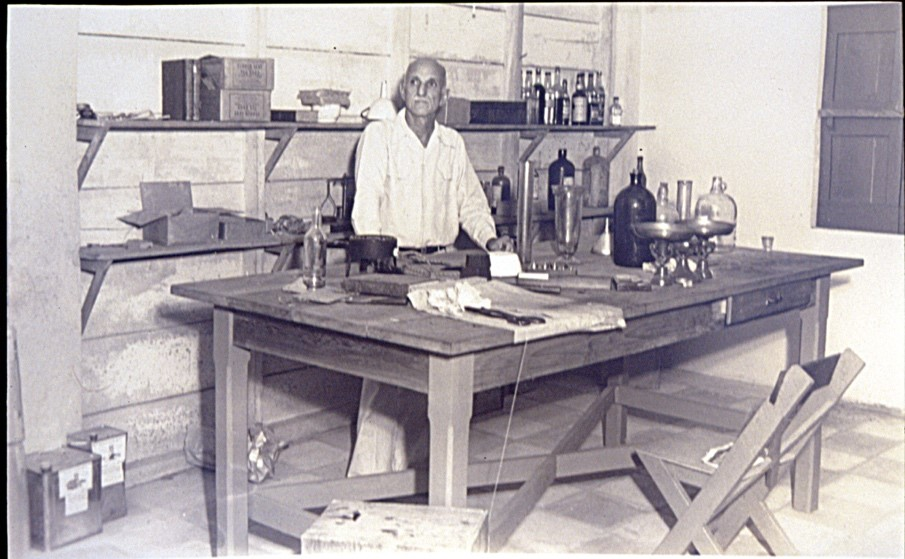
Edmundo Fernandez, Ron del Barrilito's master blender

== History ==
=== Origins ===
Hacienda Santa Ana's origins date back to Fernando Fernández. A native of Cantabria, Spain, Fernández came to Puerto Rico in 1787. He was a privateer for the Spanish Crown. After retiring he was bestowed large tracts of farmland, approximately 2,500 acres, located along Puerto Rico's northern coast. This land was mostly used for growing sugarcane, one of the island's largest crops in that era. At this time the Hacienda Santa Ana only produced sugar, not rum. However, as was common during the era Haciendas made their own personal rum with the molasses by-product of the sugar production.

Fernando Fernández had two sons: José Ramón and Manuel. José Ramón, the oldest, inherited Hacienda La Esperanza in the town of Manatí, Puerto Rico. Manuel, the youngest, was left in charge of Hacienda Santa Ana in Bayamón.

=== Beginning of rum production ===
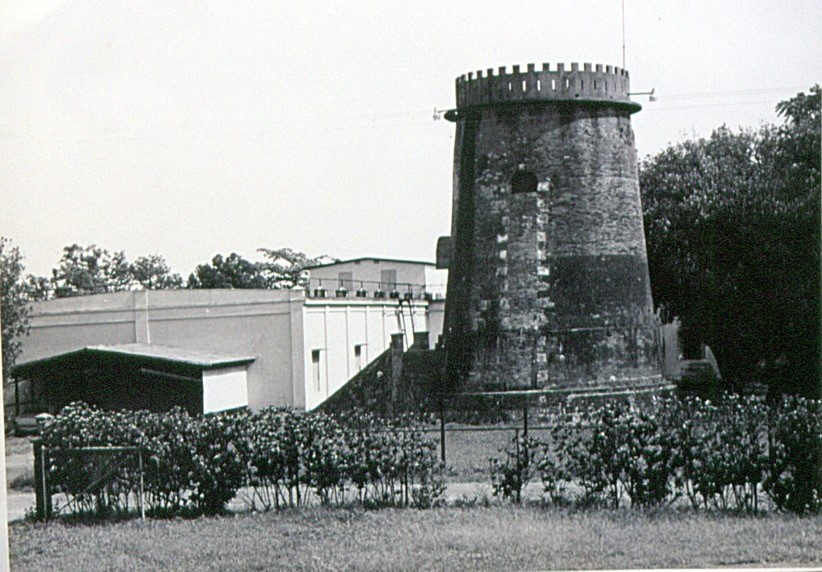
Rum Production Hacienda Santa Ana

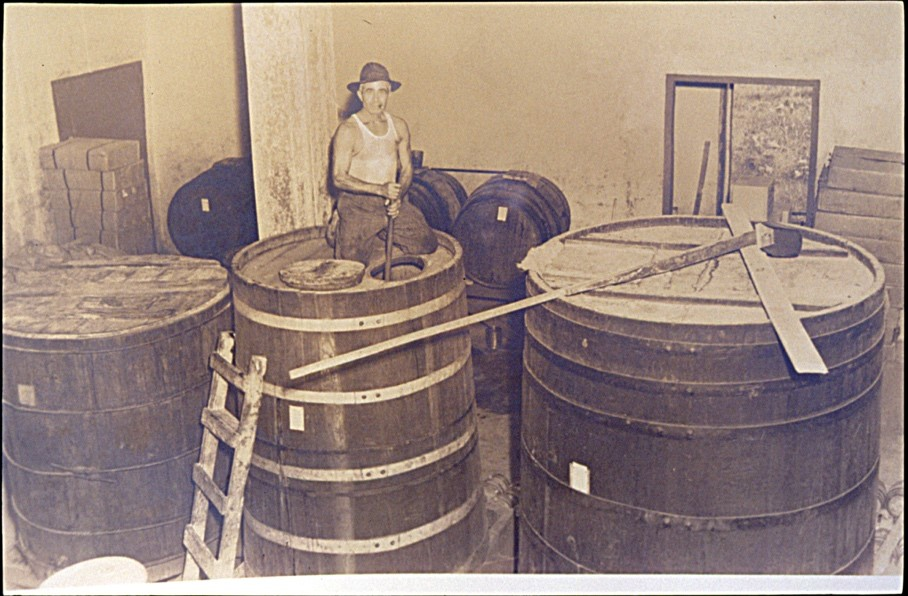
Barrels Ron Barrilito

Rum production at Hacienda Santa Ana's started during the family's third generation in Puerto Rico. During the mid-1860s, Pedro Fernández, one of Manuel's sons, went away to study engineering in France, where he developed an interest in the production of brandies and cognacs.

Upon his return to Puerto Rico in 1871, taking a cue from the European custom of families producing their own liquors for their personal use and to entertain visitors, Pedro started producing rum.

Although the rum was initially produced for private consumption, word started spreading amongst the Hacienda's frequent visitors that the rum produced by Pedro Fernández at Santa Ana was truly exceptional. The story goes that the rum was kept in a barrel at the Hacienda and that, whenever Pedro Fernández asked his visitors if they would care for a drink, more often than not, they asked for some “rum from the small barrel” or, more endearingly in Spanish “ron del barrilito”, so in 1880, when Pedro Fernández decided to start selling rum, he used this phrase as the brand name. The name Ron del Barrilito, as well as the rum it describes and the label that distinguishes it, have remained unchanged since 1880.

=== Next generations ===
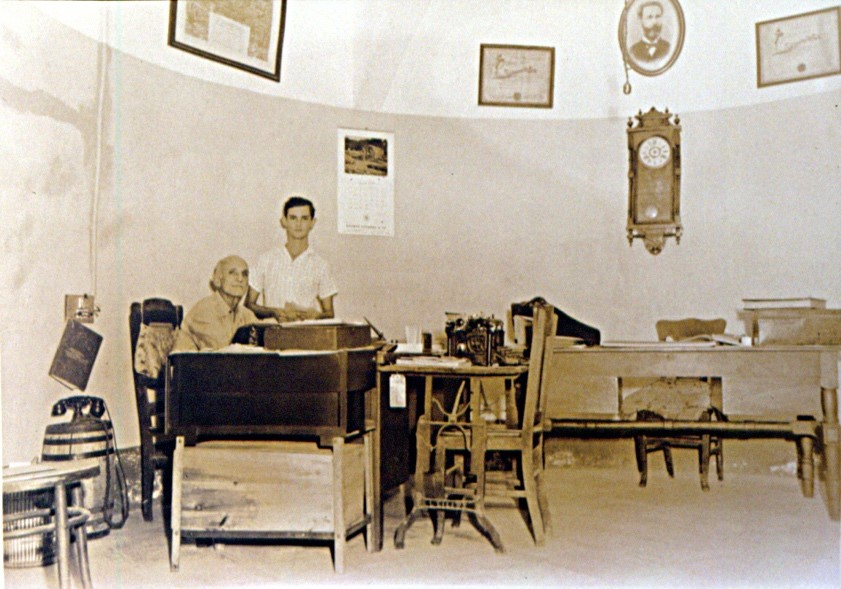
Edmundo Fernández, Hacienda Santa Ana

In the early twentieth century, Edmundo Fernández, one of Pedro's sons, would follow in his father's footsteps as Ron del Barrilito's master blender. The century started with tremendous challenges for the family business. Puerto Rico, by then a territory of the United States, was subject to the 1920 Prohibition Amendment, which made it illegal to produce and sell alcoholic beverages anywhere in the country. Ron del Barrilito, as well as every other liquor and spirits manufacturer in the United States, had to cease operations immediately.

In 1933, when the Prohibition Era ended, Edmundo Fernández resumed production and introduced the first new product Ron del Barrilito had made in decades. The blend first commercialized by Pedro Fernández in 1880 is what today is known as Ron del Barrilito Tres Estrellas (“Three Stars”), but after Prohibition, Edmundo Fernández saw an opportunity to craft a younger rum, called Ron del Barrilito Dos Estrellas (“Two Stars”).

Throughout the rest of the twentieth century and into the twenty-first century, Edmundo's children and grandchildren continued to produce Ron del Barrilito, and as of 2018 Ron del Barrilito is still made at Hacienda Santa Ana using the same formula and in small batches.

Hacienda Santa Ana is home to some of the oldest aging rum stocks in the Caribbean. One such example is “La Doña,” also known as the "Freedom Barrel", a barrel that was filled and laid to age in 1952 by Edmundo Fernández with instructions that it should only be opened when Puerto Rico becomes independent, and it would be placed in the town's square for folks to have a free shot from it. Over a century later, the barrel remains unopened and serves as symbol of national pride and family heritage.

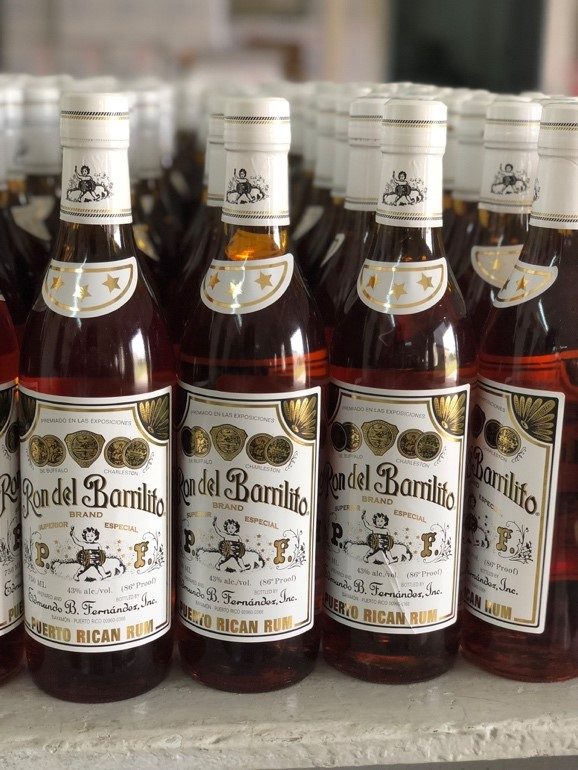
Ron del Barrilito rum

== Methods ==
Much of Ron del Barrilito's formula remains a closely guarded family secret, apart from the fact that it is aged in vintage white oak barrels that previously held “oloroso” sherry, and that no artificial flavorings or colorings are used in the process.

== Packaging ==
Ron del Barrilito's iconic label has remained virtually unchanged since the late nineteenth century. The medals on the main label's upper segment were awarded for quality during various Expositions across the United States in the early twentieth century.

The star-based denomination is another takeaway that Pedro Fernández learned from French brandy making. It was common practice in France at that time to use stars to show the quality of a particular brandy.

== Varieties ==
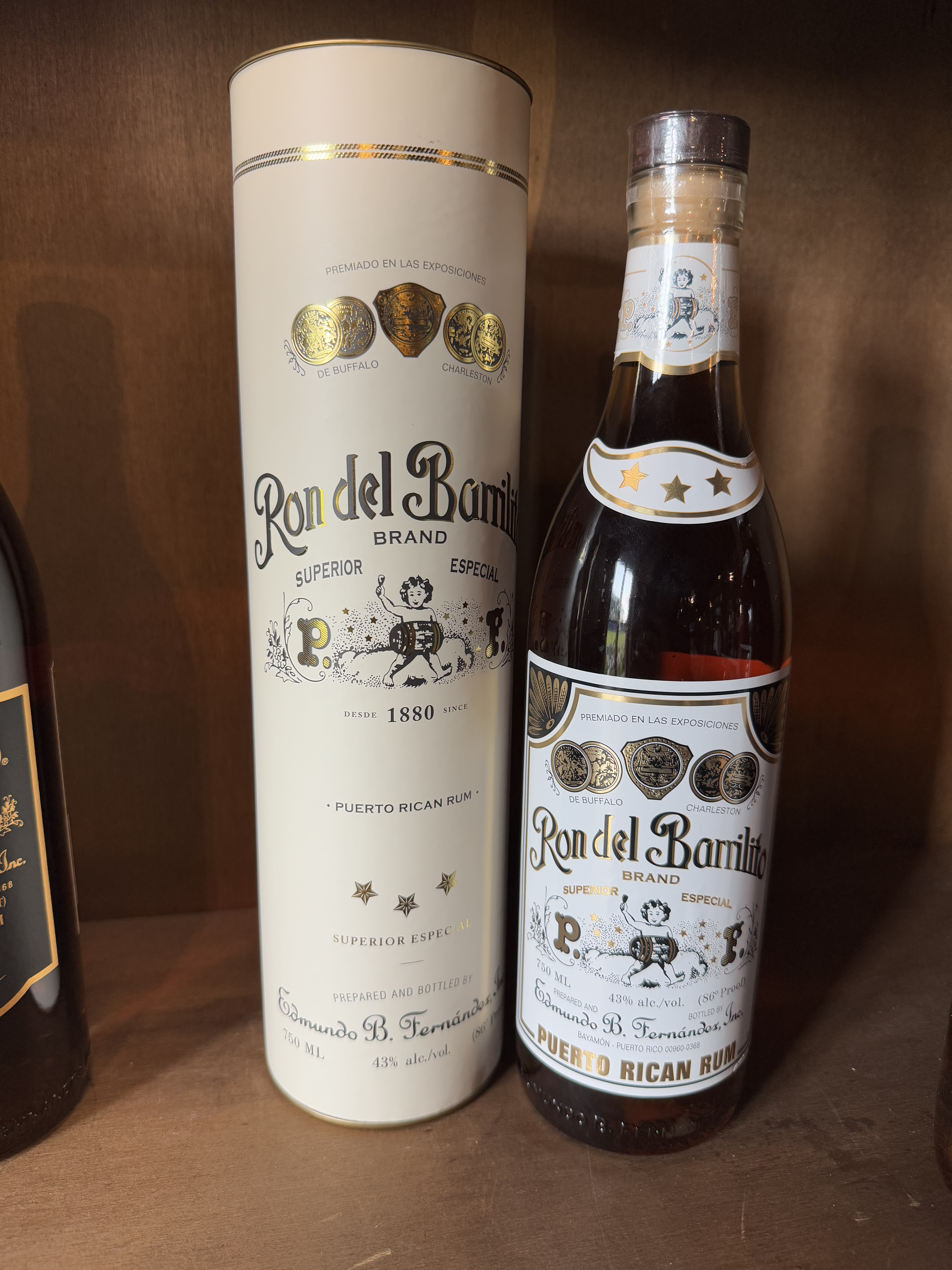
Ron del Barrilito Tres Estrellas

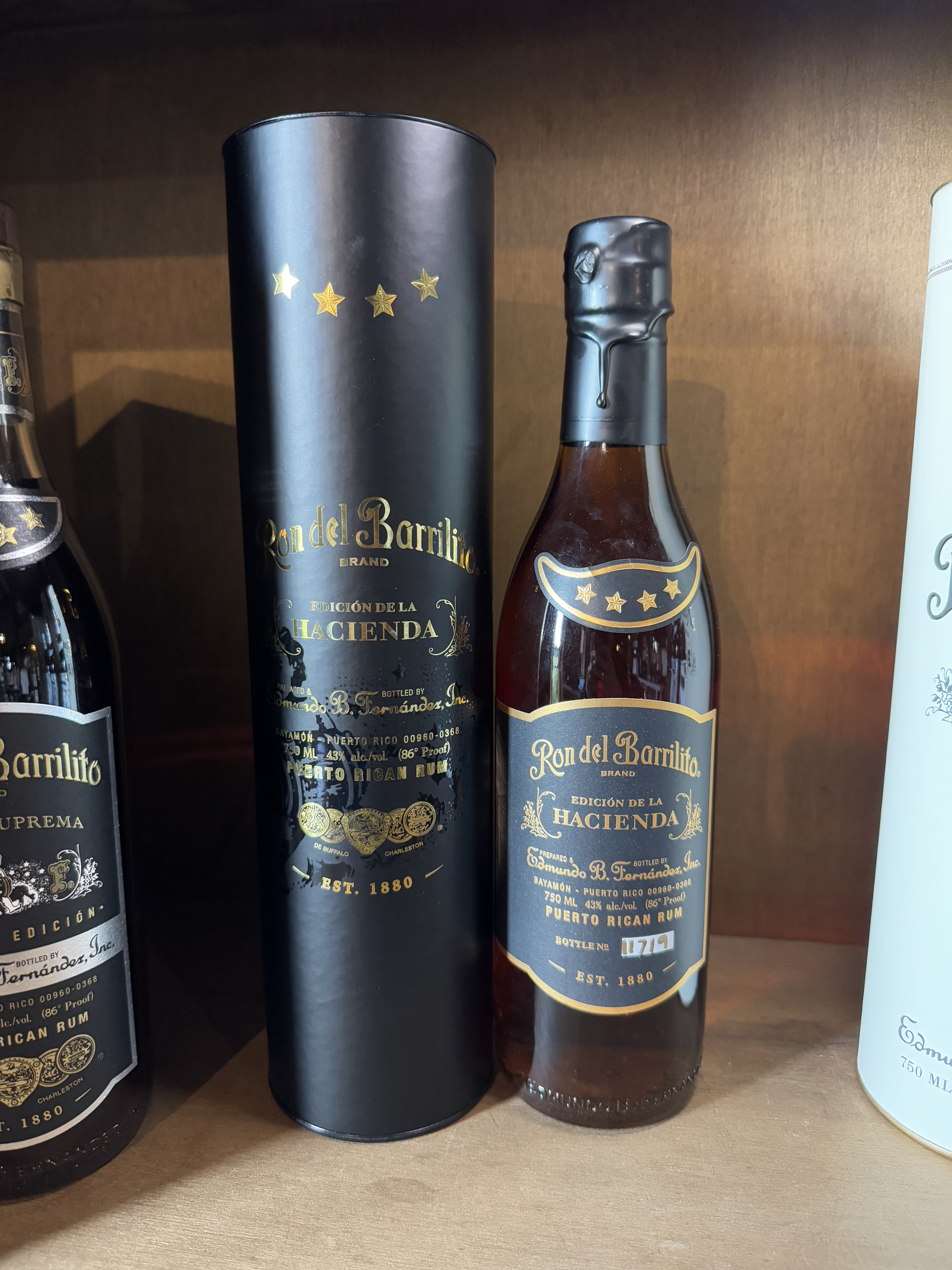
Ron del Barrilito Cuatro Estrellas

The original rum that started it all is known today as Ron del Barrilito Tres Estrellas (“Three Stars”). It is a blend of rums aged between 6 and 10 years. It is a versatile rum that can be used for anything from cocktails to sipping.

Later introduced during the Prohibition Era, Ron del Barrilito Dos Estrellas (“Two Stars”) is a younger rum better suited for everyday drinking. Dos Estrellas is aged between 3 and 5 years.

In 2018, Ron del Barrilito launched a limited edition production of Ron del Barrilito Cinco Estrellas (“Five Stars”) Reserva Suprema, a blend of rums aged up to 35 years. This rum is no longer in production, as such when the bottles run out it is gone.

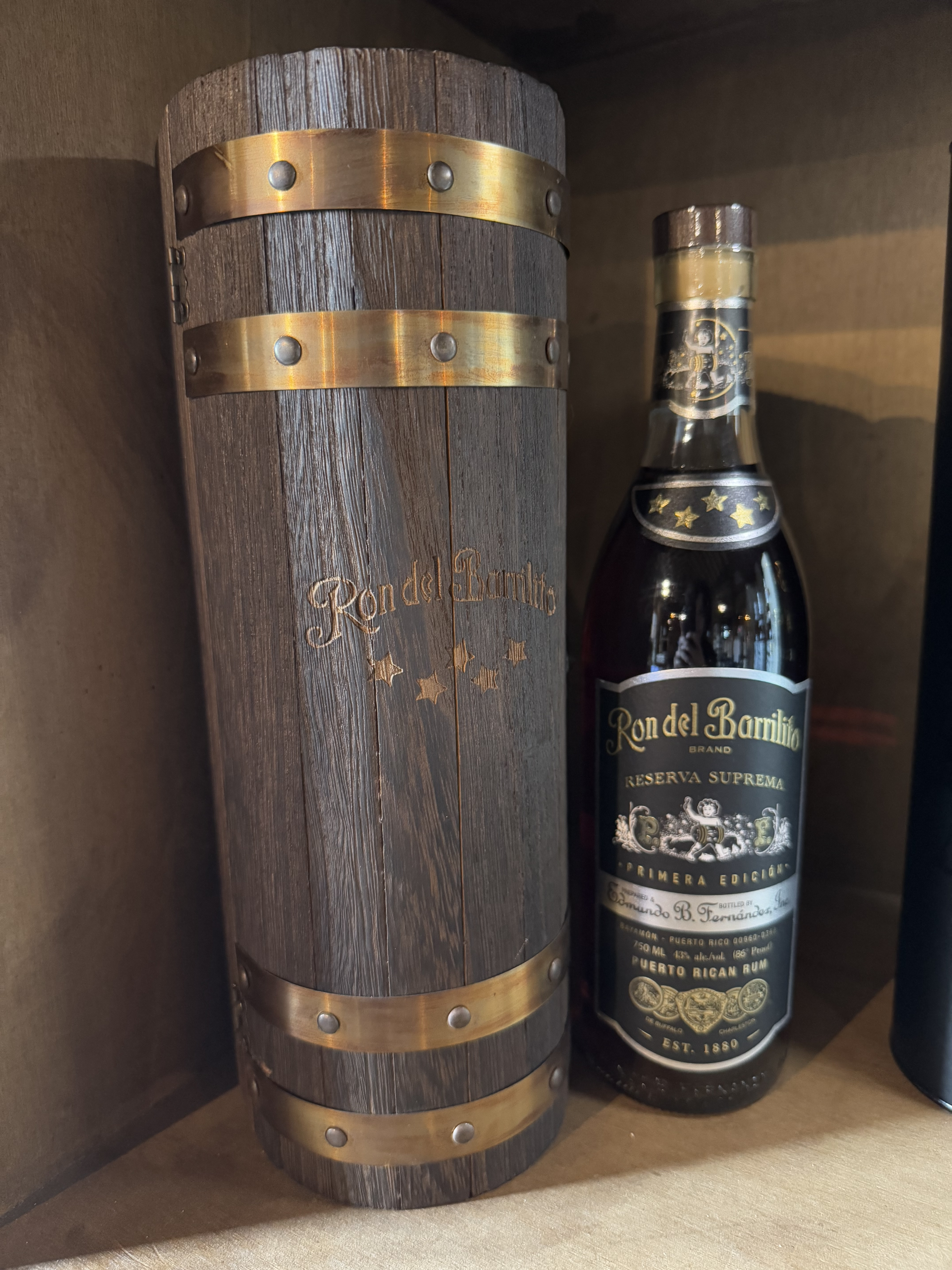
Ron del Barrilito Cinco Estrellas

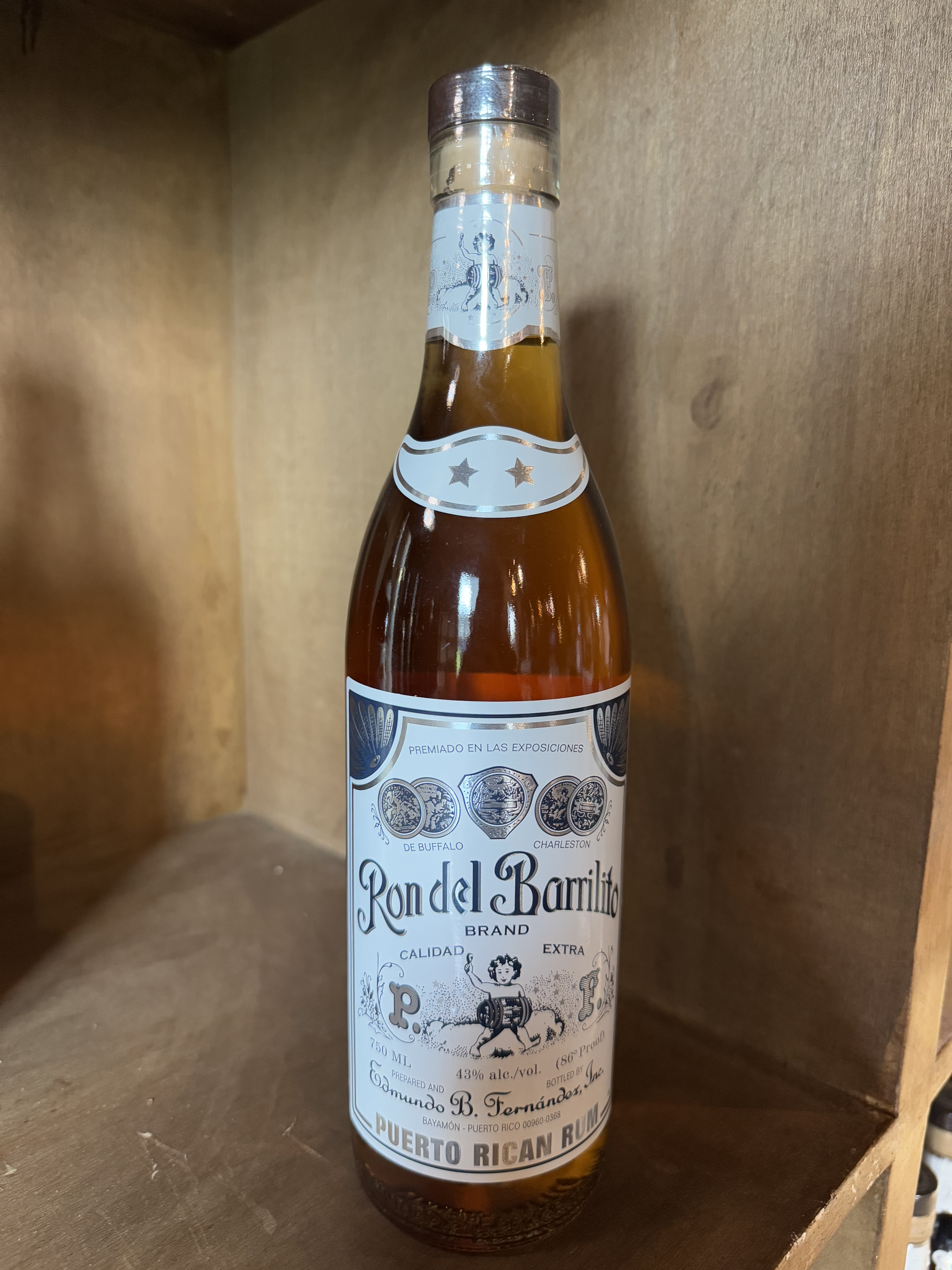
Ron del Barrilito Dos Estrellas

In 2019, to celebrate the opening of the visitor center, a special blend was created. Ron del Barrilito Cuatro Estrellas (”Four Stars”), Edicion de la Hacienda is aged between 10 and 20 years and is only available at their visitor center where customers can fill and seal their own bottle.

Ron del Barrilito also makes two unique products: Ron Hacienda Santa Ana, an overproof rum that has 69% alcohol by volume, and coquito. The coquito is made using the signature Ron del Barrilito Tres Estrellas rum.

In 2023, Ron del Barrilito introduced its collection of single cask rums to the public. The Autobiografia Don Pedro Fernandez collection is meant to honor the Fernandez family tradition of setting aside truly exceptional rums for personal consumption on the Hacienda. Two selections of this rum have been released. The first selection was a barrel from 1991 aged for 32 years that produced only 143 bottles. It sold in two months. The second and current selection is a barrel from 1997 aged for 27 years that produced 229 bottles. The unique flavor profiles can not be replicated as such once they are sold, it is no longer available.

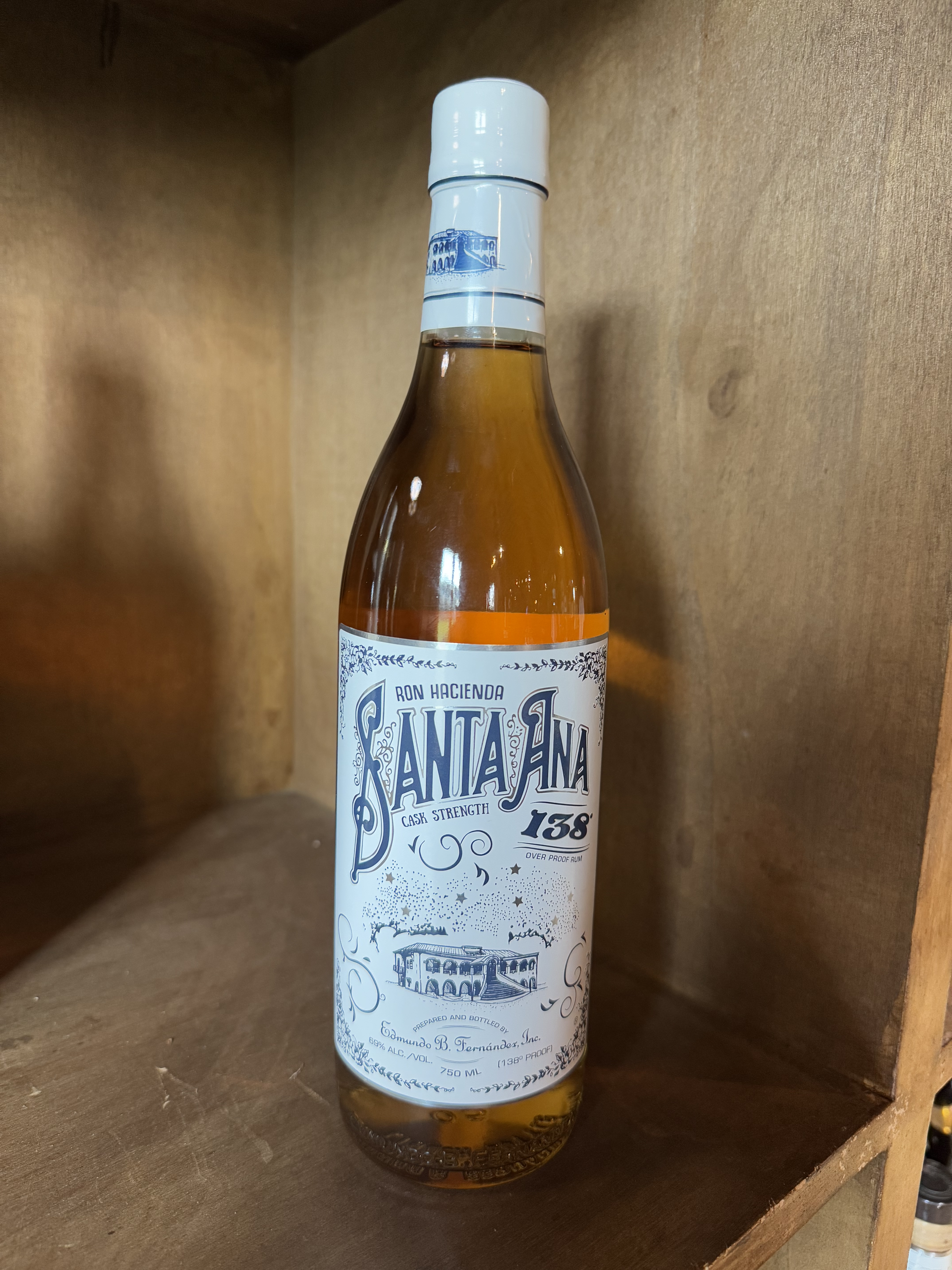
Hacienda Santa Ana Overproof Rum

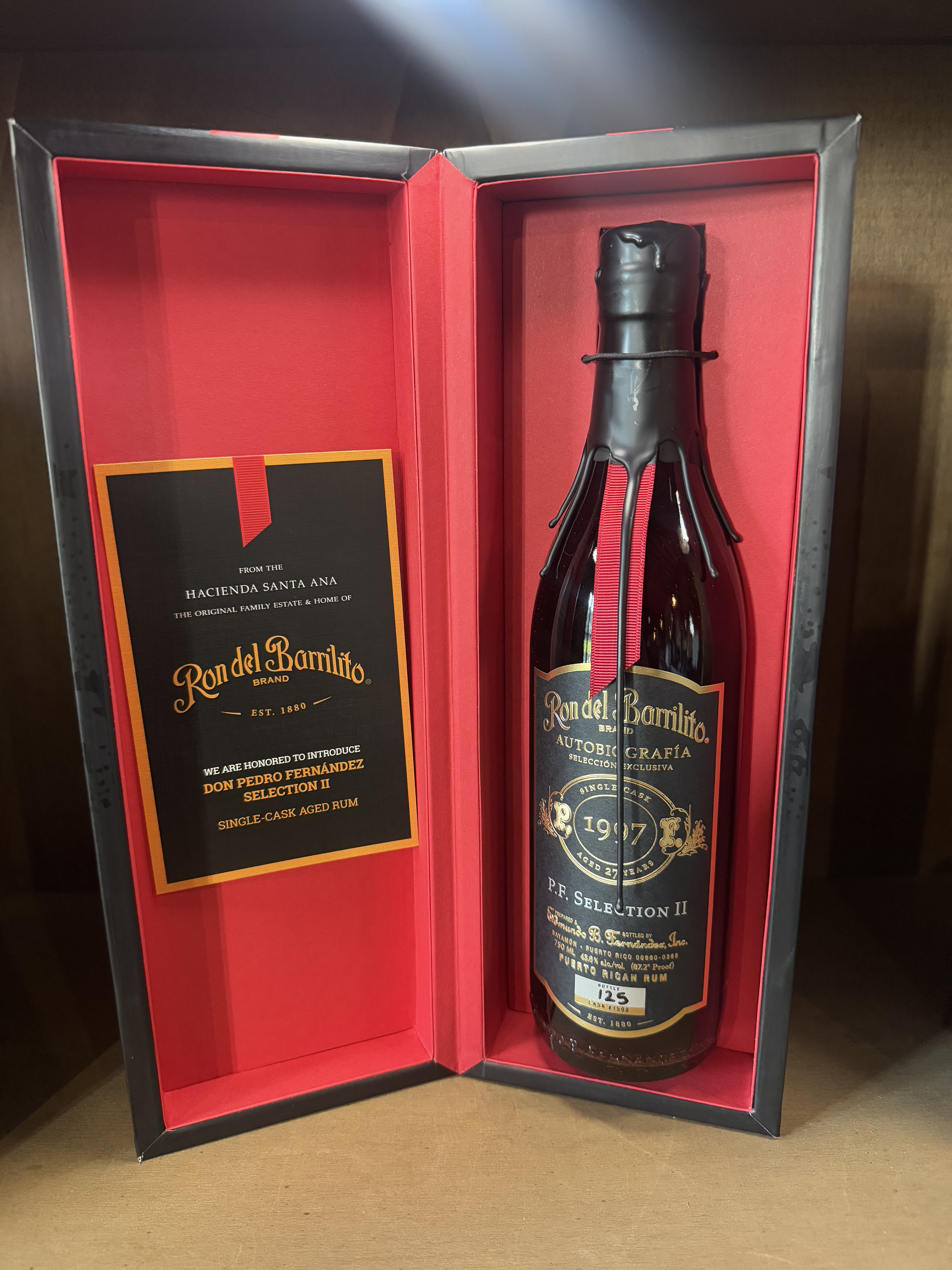
Autobiografia Don Pedro Fernandez

With exception of the overproof rum and the coquito, all of Ron del Barrilito rums are 43% Alcohol by Volume (86 Proof).

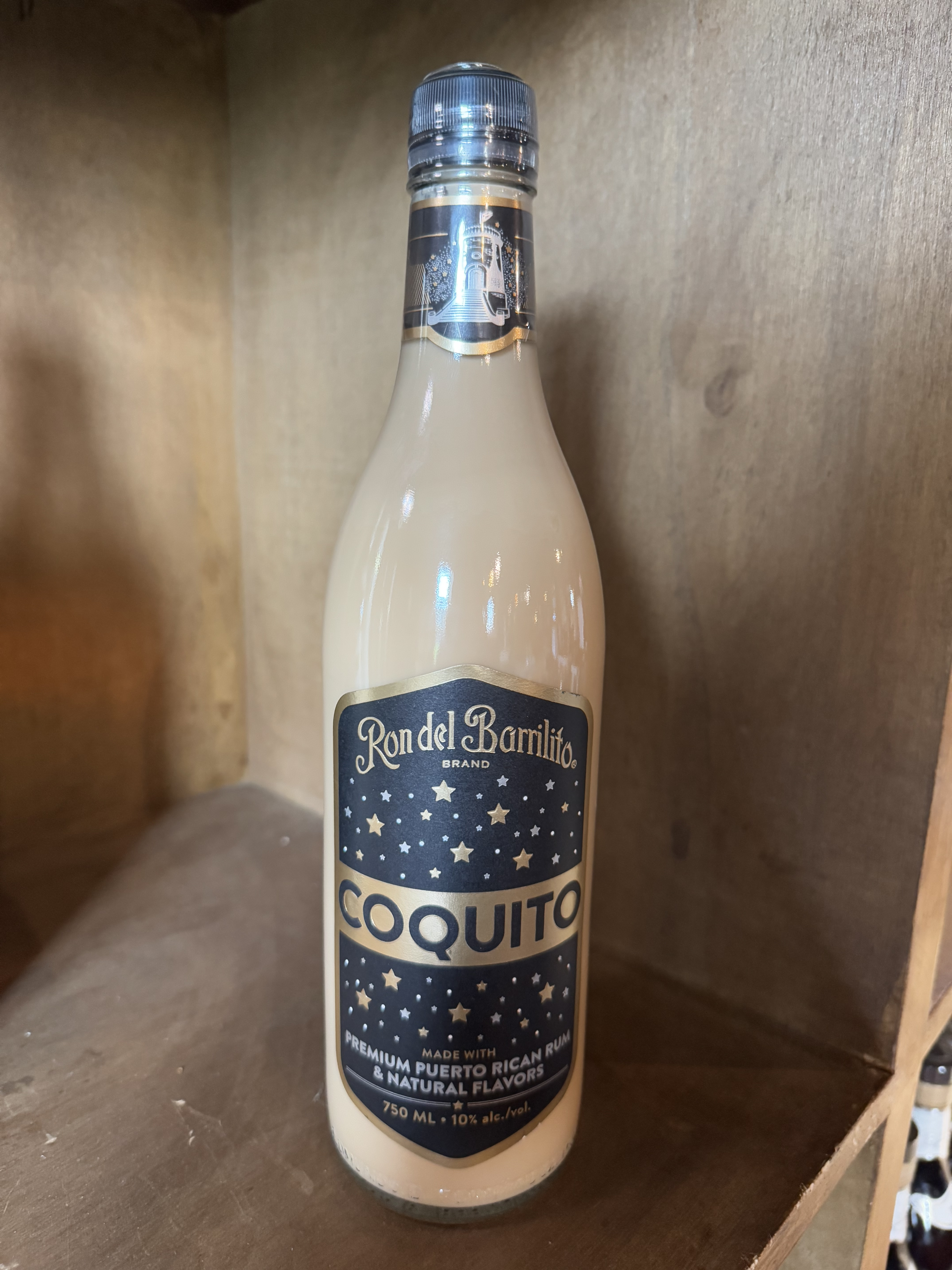
Ron del Barrilito Coquito
