= Portugués Urbano =

Barrio of Ponce, Puerto Rico

- Barrio
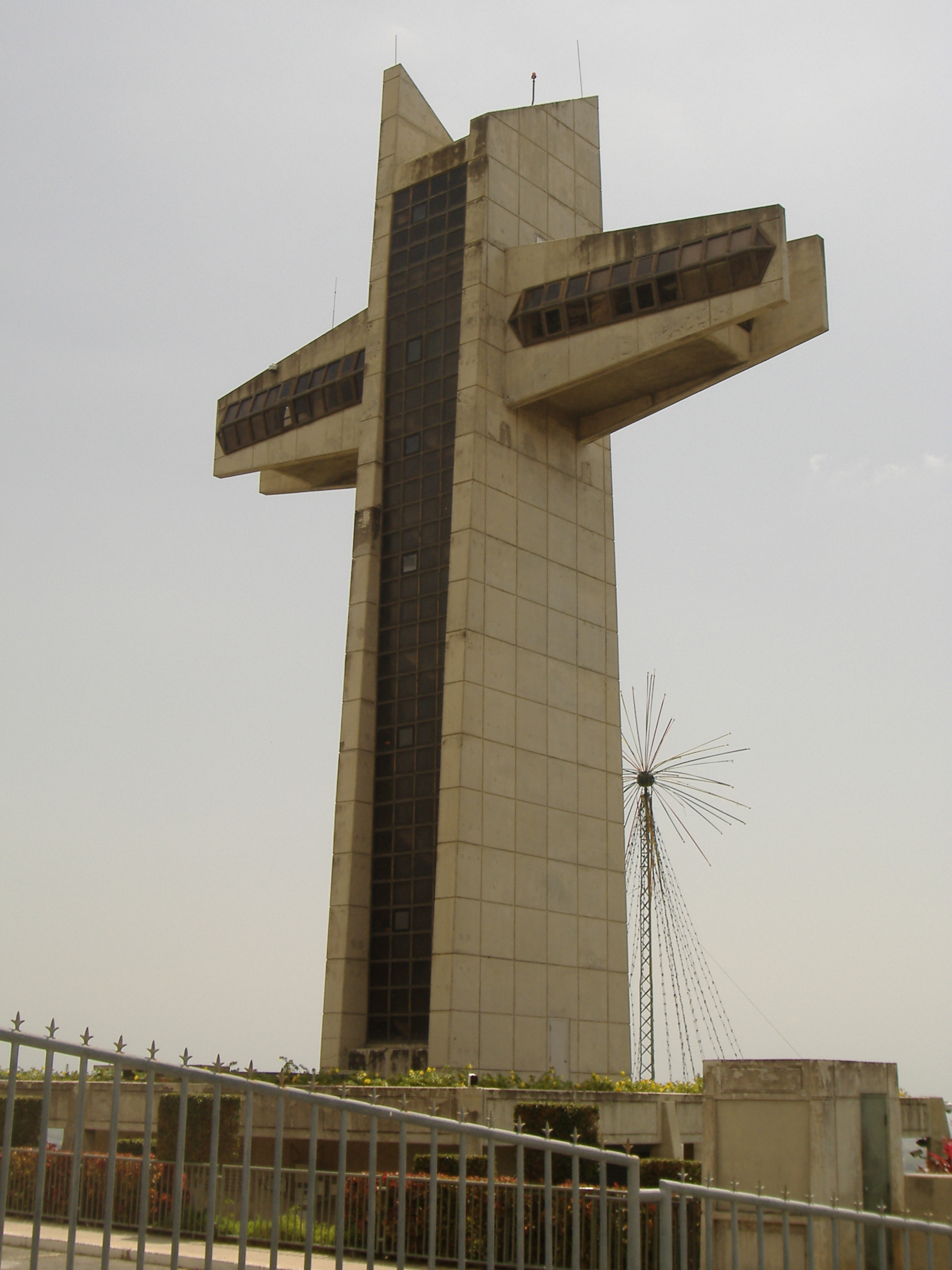
- Cruceta del Vigía is a well-known landmark located in Barrio Portugues Urbano

- Location of barrio Portugues Urbano within the municipality of Ponce shown in red

- Location of Puerto Rico
- Coordinates: 18°01′33″N 66°37′26″W
- Commonwealth: Puerto Rico
- Municipality: Ponce

Area
  - Total: 1.26 sq mi (3.3 km^{2})
  - Land: 1.26 sq mi (3.3 km^{2})
  - Water: 0 sq mi (0 km^{2})
- Elevation: 381 ft (116 m)

Population (2010)
  - Total: 4,110
  - Density: 3,261.9/sq mi (1,259.4/km^{2})
- Source: 2010 Census
- Time zone: UTC−4 (AST)

Portugués Urbano is one of the 31 barrios in the municipality of Ponce, Puerto Rico. Along with Canas Urbano, Machuelo Abajo, Magueyes Urbano, and San Antón, Portugués Urbano is one of the municipality's five originally rural barrios that are now also part of the urban zone of the city of Ponce. It was founded in 1953.

== Location ==
Portugués Urbano is an urban barrio located in the southern section of the municipality, north of the downtown Ponce Historic Zone area of the city of Ponce, but within the city limits of the city of Ponce.

== Boundaries ==
It is bounded on the North by Camino de Ponce (Golf Club) Street, Majagua Street, and Arboleda Street, on the South by Idilid Street, Shangai Street, Diez Street, Cinco Street, Pico Dulce Street, and Paseo de la Cruceta, on the West by Novedades Street, the hills east of Ponce Cement and the future western branch of PR-9, and on the East by Río Portugues (roughly), PR-503 (roughly), Cayey Street, Cerro San Tomas Street.

In terms of barrio-to-barrio boundaries, Portugués Urbano is bounded in the North by Portugués Rural, in the South by Canas Urbano and Segundo, in the West by Magueyes Urbano, and in the East by Machuelo Arriba and Sexto.

== History ==
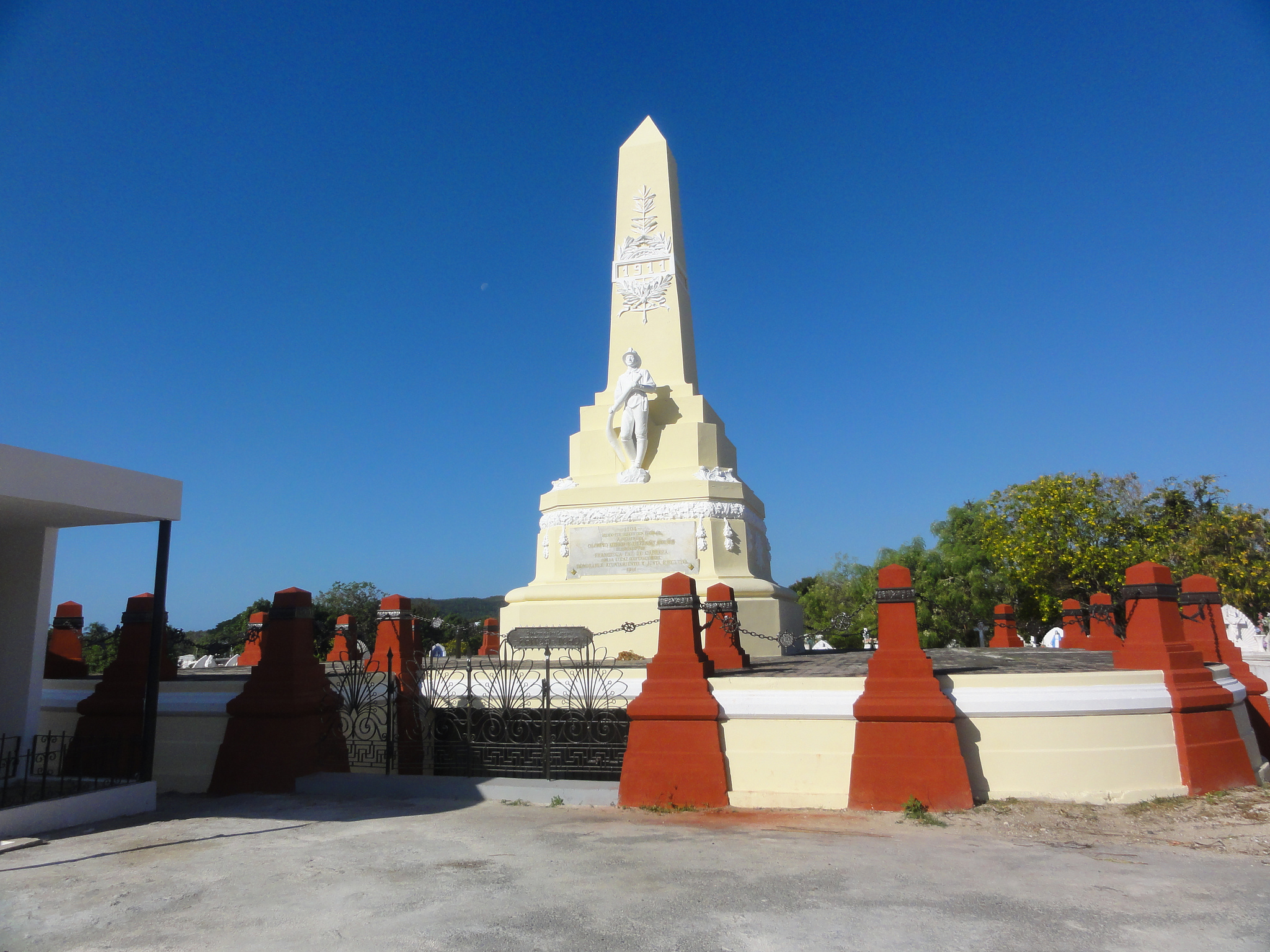
Mausoleo Bomberos de Ponce, Cementerio Civil, Barrio Portugués Urbano

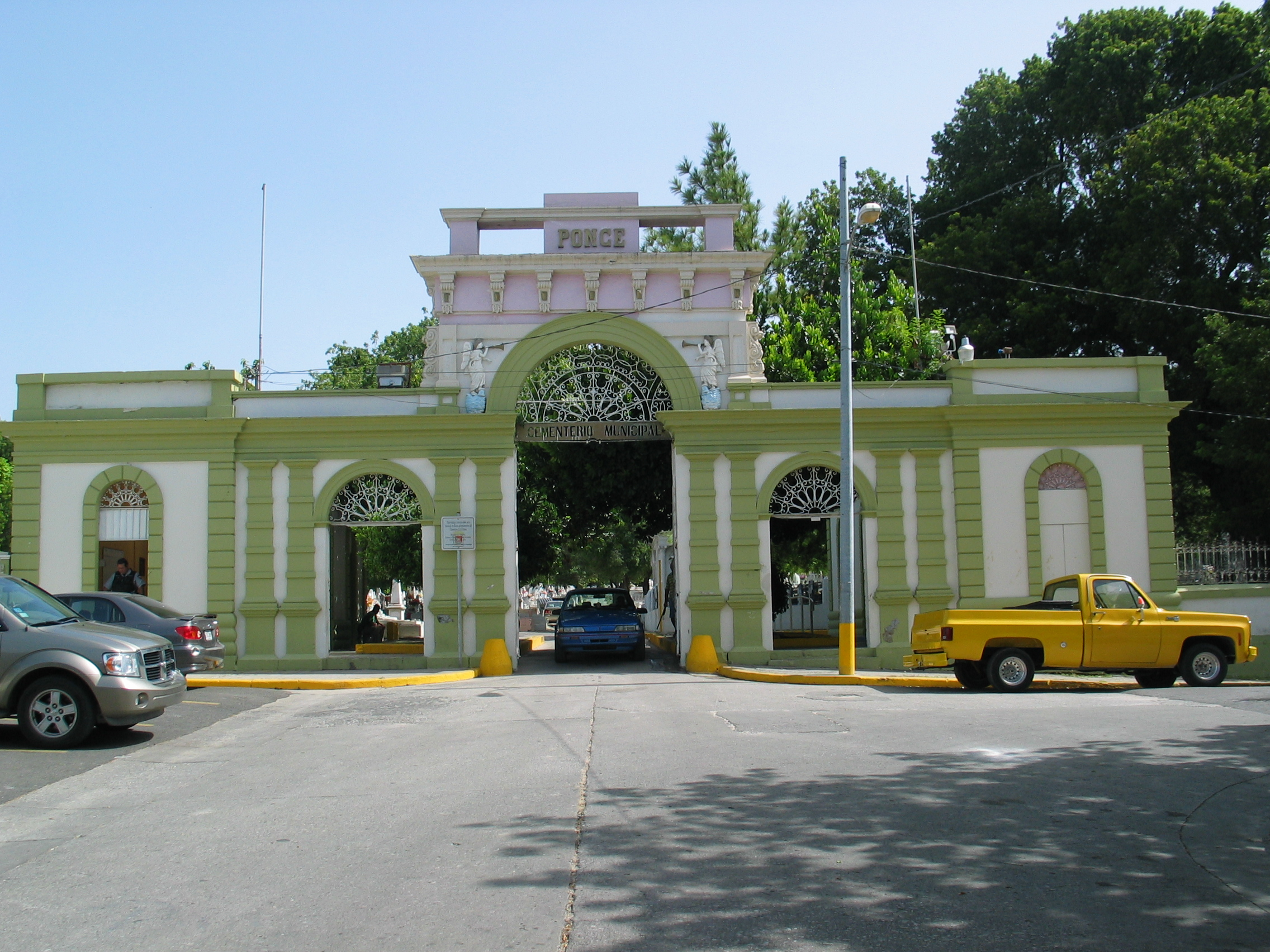
Cementerio Civil de Ponce, located in Barrio Portugues Urbano

Río Portugués and the great Ceiba tree near the center of Ponce have long been associated with the first settlers of the region. During the 17th century the river marked the eastern boundary of a growing settlement than ran as far as Guayanilla Bay, a region that came to be known as Ponce, but which today is part of a neighboring municipality.

In 1824, Barrio Portugués appears for the first time in a list of the barrios of Ponce produced by Pedro Tomás de Córdova, and to whom we owe the first such listing of 497 Puerto Rico barrios in the towns that existed at the time. However, the name Barrio Portugués does not show up in records of the municipality of Ponce until September 1821. In 1822, Barrio Portugués appears as one of the barrios of the settlement with a listing of names of people responsible for the supervision of the barrios of the municipality. In 1878, Manuel Ubeda y Delgado reported that in Barrio Portugués there were 155 families residing in 33 houses and 100 bohios. Portugués was then the seventh least populated of the 22 barrios then established in the municipality. The same author reports the existence of thermal baths in an area a little over two kilometers northeast of the city known as the Quintana Baths (Baños Quintana). The masonry building that housed the baths still exists on the northbound side of Puerto Rico Highway 503 in Barrio Portugués.

=== Origin of the name ===
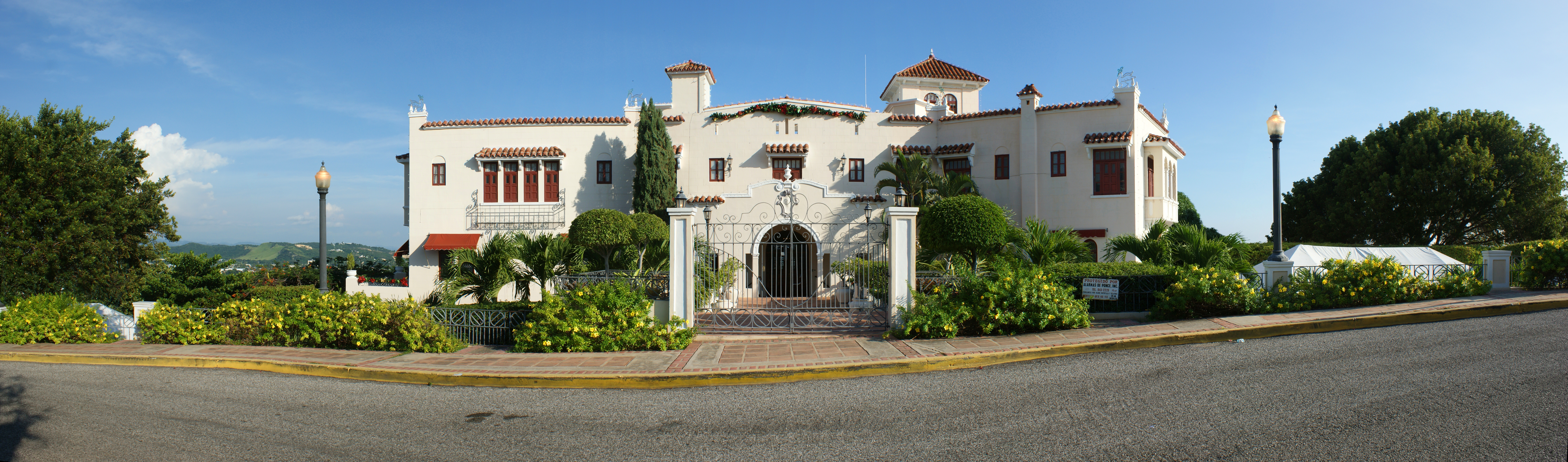
Castillo Serralles, in Barrio Portugues Urbano, attracts over 100,000 visitors a year

The name Hato de Portugués has been traced back to the Puerto Rico General Registry of Lands of November 1800. Hatos were holdings of large tracts of lands dedicated to cattle raising. They were the basic territorial units in Puerto Rico in until the late 19th century.

The name, however, may in fact be much older. Towards the end of the 16th century, even before the birth of the village of Ponce, Don Pedro Rodríguez de Guzmán (Note: Another source names this early settler "Pedro Perdomo de Guzmán". It is not clear which of the two names is the correct name, or if his name was perhaps Pedro Rodríguez Perdomo de Guzmán or some other variation. See Historia de Nuestros Barrios: Portugués, Ponce. Rafael Torrech San Inocencio. El Sur a la Vista. Ponce, Puerto Rico. Elsuralavista.com. 14 February 2010.) established a small community and a store on the banks of Río Baramaya. Rodríguez, one of the first settlers of what is known as Ponce today, is the original Portugués. Some sources state he was from Portugal, other sources state he was from San German but of Portuguese ancestry. According to historian Rafael Torrech San Inocencio, "the store of Rodríguez de Guzmán, a.k.a. "El Portugués" ("The Portuguese"), was located on the banks of Río Baramaya, possibly at a crossing, that is, at a place where it was possible to cross the river, whether afoot or on horseback, with relative ease. River crossings are very old place names, for during those years it was important to find a place to cross a river, and...many of the names of barrios and municipalities in Puerto Rico originated with such old river crossings. It is possible that as the years passed the fame of the Portugues Crossing faded away, and the names of the crossing and of the river were exchanged in everyday conversation, and folks started to call Río Portugues what was really Rio Baramaya. And, what is more, as time passed this unofficial name of the river was accidentally used to refer to the hato in that area, and thus, to today's Barrio Portugués. As time progressed and the urban zone of the city grew into the then Barrio Portugues geographic area, the municipality split off the southern urbanized area of the then Barrio Portugués and named it Barrio Portugués Urbano.

== Features and demographics ==
The communities of Mameyes, El Vigia, and Jaime L. Drew, are located within the limits of barrio Portugués Urbano.

In 2000, Portugués Urbano had 1.14 square miles (3.0 km^{2}) of land area and no water surface area. In 2000, the population of Portugués Urbano was 5,886 persons, and it had a density of 5,163 persons per square mile. The Mameyes landslide tragedy occurred here.

In 2010, Portugués Urbano had 1.26 square miles (3.3 km^{2}) of land area and no water surface area and the population of Portugués Urbano was 4,110 persons with a density of 3,261.9 persons per square mile.

The highest point in Barrio Portugués Urbano is Cerro Ponce 2 which stands at 574 feet. Another notable land feature is Cerro El Vigia which stands at 364 feet.

== Mameyes landslide ==
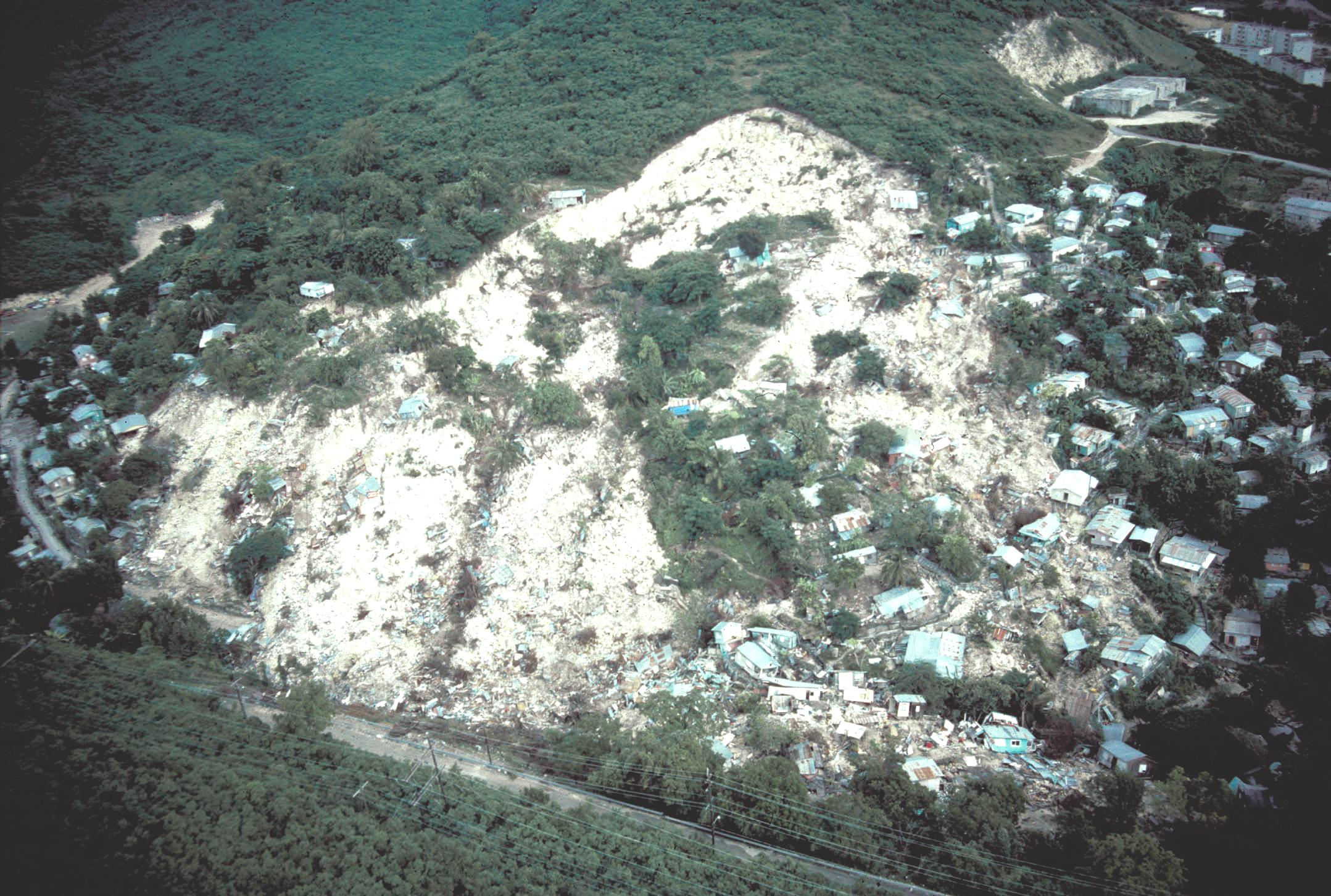
The 1985 Mameyes landslide in Barrio Portugués Urbano killed over 100 people. It is the worst landslide disaster in North America

Portugués Urbano attracted attention when, in 1985, over 100 people were buried in their sleep from a landslide as a result of heavy rains, in the Mameyes sector of Barrio Portugués Urbano. On October 7, 1985, Ponce was the scene of this major tragedy, when at least 129 people died to a mudslide in the Mameyes sector of Barrio Portugués Urbano. The heavy rains were part of the 1985 Puerto Rico floods. International help was needed to rescue people and corpses. The United States and many other countries, including Mexico, France, and Venezuela, sent economic, human, and machinery relief. The municipal government, subsequently, moved the remaining residents of the sector to newly built homes in a safer area of the municipality.

== Notable landmarks ==
Barrio Portugués Urbano is home to Serralles Castle and Cruceta El Vigía, both tourist attractions.

== See also ==
- Tropical Storm Isabel (1985)
- List of communities in Puerto Rico
