= Pedro Albizu Campos (statue) =

Statue of Pedro Albizu Campos in Ponce, Puerto Rico

- Location of the statue within Puerto Rico
- Artist: Rafael Lopez del Campo
- Year: 1992
- Type: Bronze on marble pedestal
- Condition: Pristine
- Location: Parque Pedro Albizu Campos Tenerias sector, Barrio Machuelo Abajo, Ponce; 18°00′36.2154″N 66°35′36.8514″W
- Owner: Municipality of Ponce

Pedro Albizu Campos is a statue to the memory of the Puerto Rican attorney and politician, and the leading figure in the Puerto Rican independence movement, Pedro Albizu Campos. It is at Parque Pedro Albizu Campos in Ponce, Puerto Rico, where Albizu Campos's residence used to be in the community of Tenerias, Barrio Machuelo Abajo. The statue is in bronze.

== Background ==
Pedro Albizu Campos (1891 – 1965) was a Puerto Rican attorney and politician. He was the main figure in the Puerto Rico independence movement. He was born and lived in the house that was located at the spot where his statue currently stands until 1912 when he received a scholarship to study at the University of Vermont. He subsequently graduated from the Harvard Law School and returned to Puerto Rico where he led the struggle for Puerto Rican independence from the United States.

== Description ==
The statue was sculptured by Rafael Lopez del Campo. The nine feet high statue is the product of the foundry of Puerto Rican sculptor Severo Romero. It was unveiled in 1992. It sits atop a six foot high concrete and marble pedestal. Rafael Cordero Santiago, mayor of Ponce at the time, was one of the main supporters of the monument. The statue was made possible through the Union de Tronquistas de Puerto Rico, who was in charge of collecting donations to cover its cost.
