= Magueyes Urbano =

Barrio of Ponce, Puerto Rico

- Barrio
- Location of barrio Magueyes Urbano within the municipality of Ponce shown in red

- Location of Puerto Rico
- Coordinates: 18°01′29″N 66°38′12″W
- Commonwealth: Puerto Rico
- Municipality: Ponce

Area
  - Total: 1.24 sq mi (3.2 km^{2})
  - Land: 1.24 sq mi (3.2 km^{2})
  - Water: 0 sq mi (0 km^{2})
- Elevation: 338 ft (103 m)

Population (2010)
  - Total: 1,132
  - Density: 912.9/sq mi (352.5/km^{2})
- Source: 2010 Census
- Time zone: UTC−4 (AST)

Magueyes Urbano is one of the 31 barrios in the municipality of Ponce, Puerto Rico. Along with Canas Urbano, Machuelo Abajo, Portugués Urbano, and San Antón, Magueyes Urbano is one of the municipality's five originally rural barrios that are now also part of the urban zone of the city of Ponce. The name of this barrio is of native Indian origin. It was created in 1953.

== Location ==
Magueyes Urbano is an urban barrio located in the southern section of the municipality, within the Ponce city limits, and northwest of the traditional center of the city, Plaza Las Delicias.

== Boundaries ==
It is bounded on the North by J. J. Cartagena Street (Las Delicias community), Ruth Fernandez Boulevard, and Camino de Ponce (Golf Club) Road, on the South by PR-123, Ausencia Street, and La Gloria Street, on the West by the hills west of PR-123, and on the East by Novedades Street, the hills east of Ponce Cement and the future western branch of PR-9.

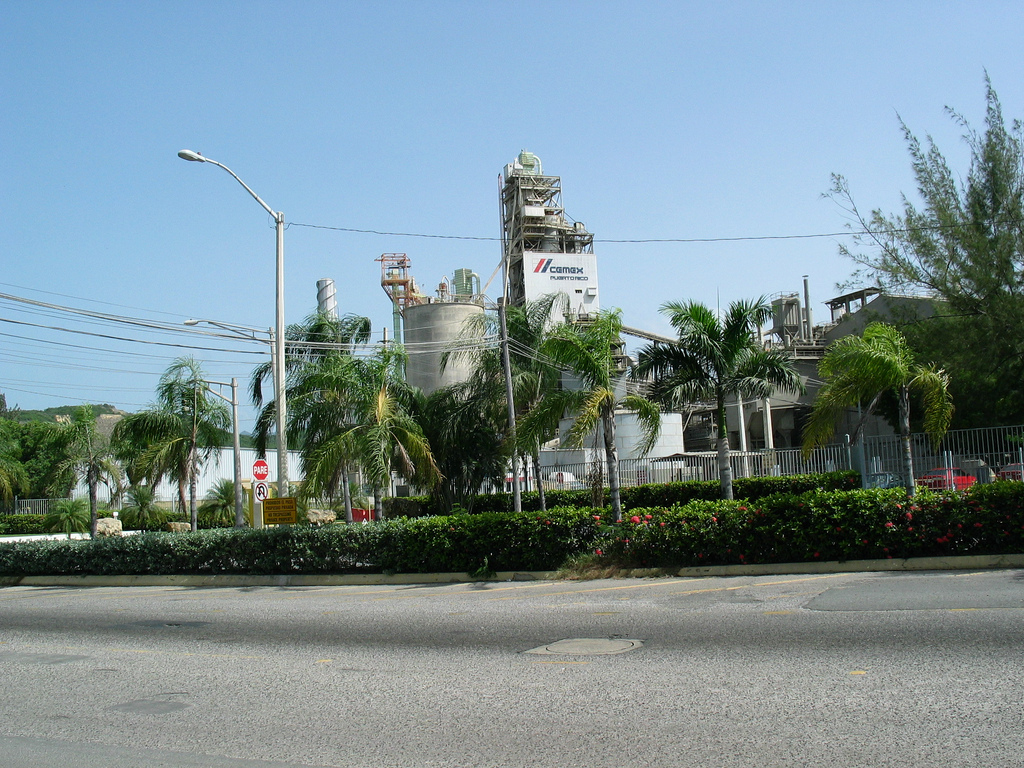
The former Ponce Cement plant in Magueyes Urbano (the plant is now owned by CEMEX)

In terms of barrio-to-barrio boundaries, Magueyes Urbano is bounded in the North by Magueyes, in the South by Canas Urbano, in the West by Canas, and in the East by Portugués Urbano. The community of Las Delicias is found here.

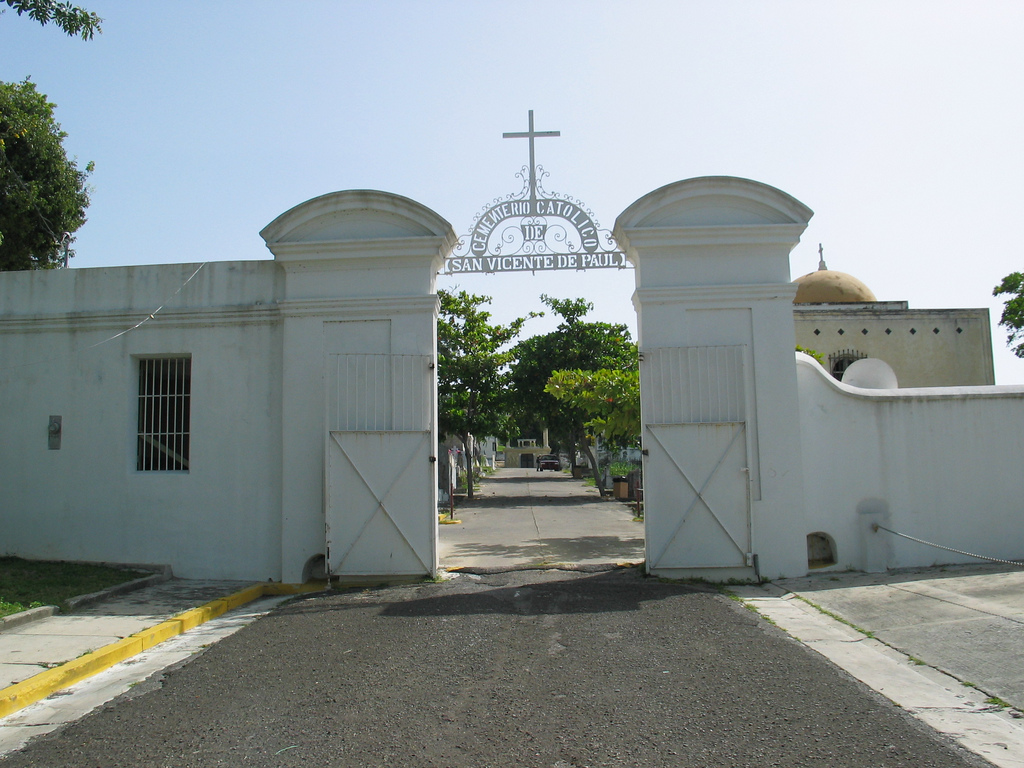
The Cementerio Catolico San Vicente de Paul, a historic landmark, in Barrio Magueyes Urbano.

== Features and demographics ==
Magueyes Urbano has 1.2 square miles (3.1 km^{2}) of land area and no water area. In 2000, the population of Magueyes Urbano was 1,332 persons, and it had a density of 1,070 persons per square mile.

In 2010, the population of Magueyes Urbano was 1,132 persons, and it had a density of 912.9 persons per square mile.

Major roads in Magueyes Urbano are PR-123 and PR-9.

== Notable landmarks ==
Barrio Magueyes Urbano is home to Ponce Cement, Inc. and the NRHP-listed Cementerio Catolico San Vicente de Paul.

== See also ==
- List of communities in Puerto Rico
