= Pedro Albizu Campos =

Puerto Rican independence activist (1893–1965)

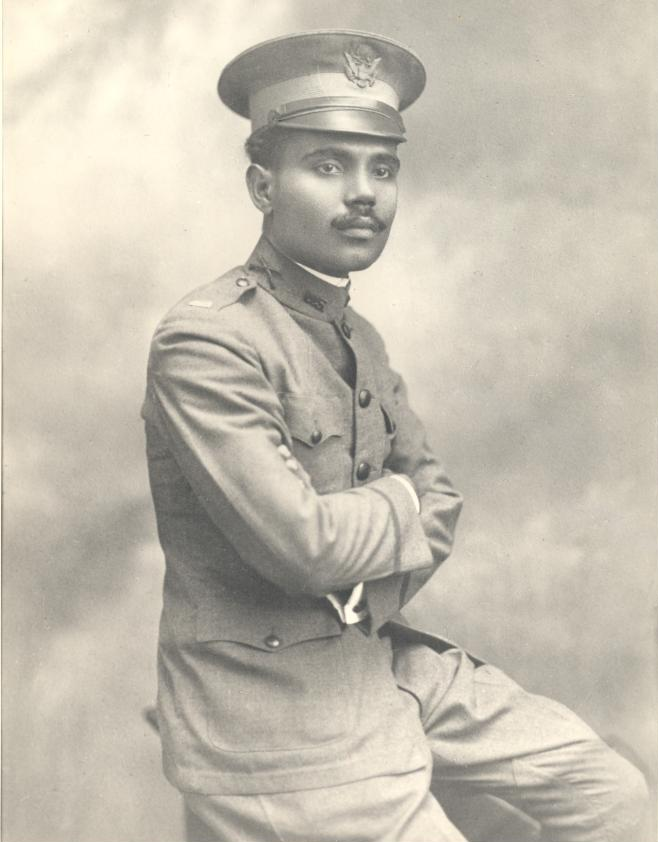
- Campos in a U.S. military uniform, c. 1916
- Born: June 29, 1893; Machuelo Abajo, Ponce, Puerto Rico
- Died: April 21, 1965 (aged 71); San Juan, Puerto Rico
- Education: University of Vermont; Harvard University
- Organization: Puerto Rican Nationalist Party
- Spouse: Laura Meneses

Pedro Albizu Campos (Note: In this Spanish name, the first or paternal surname is Albizu and the second or maternal family name is Campos.) (June 29, 1893 – April 21, 1965) was a Puerto Rican attorney and politician, and a leading figure in a significant Puerto Rican independence movement. He was the president and spokesperson of the Nationalist Party of Puerto Rico from 1930 until his death. He led the nationalist revolts of October 1950 against the United States government in Puerto Rico. Albizu Campos spent a total of twenty-six years in prison at various times for his Puerto Rican independence activities.

Albizu graduated from Harvard Law School in 1921 with the highest grade point average in his law class, an achievement that earned him the right to give the valedictorian speech at his graduation ceremony. However, animus towards his African heritage led to his professors delaying two of his final exams in order to keep Albizu Campos from graduating on time. During his time at Harvard, he became involved in the Irish struggle for independence. He spoke six languages. Because of his oratorical skill, he was hailed as El Maestro (The Teacher) by his followers.

In 1924, Albizu Campos joined the Puerto Rican Nationalist Party and became its vice president. He was elected president of the party in 1930. In 1936, the U.S. Government charged Albizu Campos in federal court with insurrection. He was found guilty and received a six-year sentence. In 1950, he planned armed uprisings in several cities in Puerto Rico. Afterward he was convicted and returned to prison. He died in 1965 shortly after his pardon and release from federal prison, some time after suffering a stroke. There is controversy over his medical treatment in prison. Albizu Campos alleged that he was the subject of human radiation experiments in prison.

== Early life and education ==
He was born in a sector of Barrio Machuelo Abajo in Ponce, Puerto Rico to Juliana Campos, a domestic worker of African ancestry, on June 29, 1893. There has been a long debate and confusion over his birthday. Official documents say it was September 12, 1891, while Albizu Campos has stated that his real birthday is June 29, 1893. His father, Alejandro Albizu Romero, known as "El Vizcaíno," was a Basque merchant, from a family of Spanish immigrants who had temporarily resided in Venezuela. His father never recognized young Pedro as his son and abandoned Juliana, leaving them in poverty. Juliana started to struggle with her mental health, taking a young Pedro to the river and attempting to drown him with her on various occasions. Luckily, he was saved many times by friends and family, though eventually his mother drowned herself in the Portugués River in Ponce. From there, Pedro Albizu Campos would be raised by his maternal aunt, Rosa Campos.

From an educated family, Albizu was the nephew of the danza composer Juan Morel Campos, and cousin of Puerto Rican educator Dr. Carlos Albizu Miranda. His father did not acknowledge him until he was at Harvard University.

Albizu Campos graduated from Ponce High School, a "public school for the city's white elite." In 1912, Albizu was awarded a scholarship to study Chemical Engineering at the University of Vermont. In 1913, he transferred to Harvard University so as to continue his studies.

At the outbreak of World War I, Albizu Campos volunteered in the United States Infantry. Albizu was commissioned a Second Lieutenant in the Army Reserves and sent to the City of Ponce, where he organized the town's Home Guard. He was called to serve in the regular Army and sent to Camp Las Casas for further training. Upon completing the training, he was assigned to the 375th Infantry Regiment. The United States Army, then segregated, assigned Puerto Ricans of recognizably African descent as soldiers to the all-black units, such as the 375th Regiment. Officers were men classified as white. Albizu Campos was black.

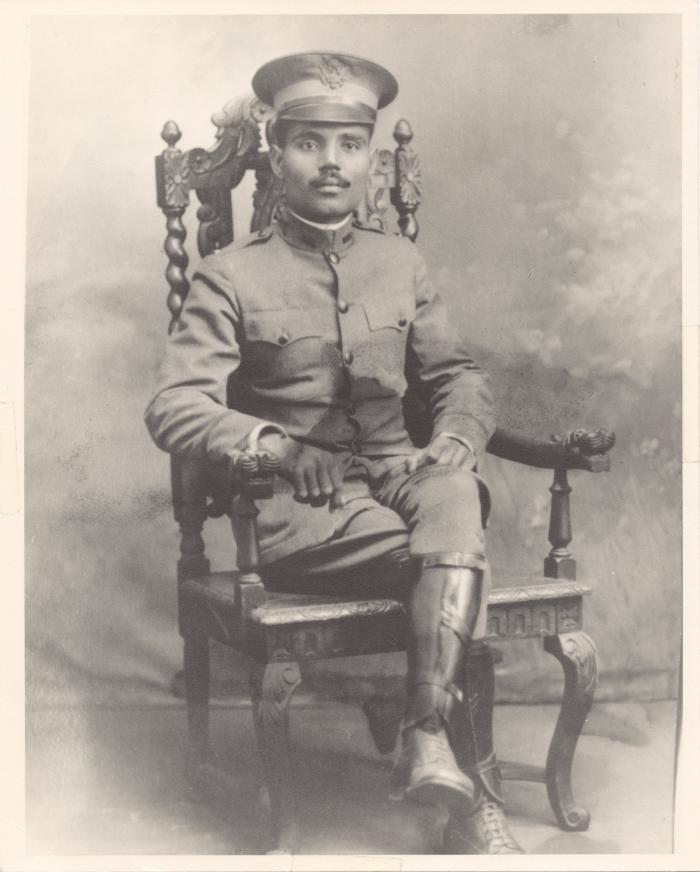
Lieutenant Pedro Albizu Campos (U.S. Army)

Albizu Campos was honorably discharged from the Army in 1919, with the rank of First Lieutenant. However, his exposure to racism during his time in the U.S. military altered his perspective on U.S.-Puerto Rico relations, and he became the leading advocate for Puerto Rican independence.

In 1919, Albizu returned to his studies at Harvard University, where he allegedly was elected president of the Harvard Cosmopolitan Club. However, there are conflicting documents on who was president of the club for the year 1914-15. While the 42nd edition of The Harvard University Register named R.N. Williams II as the president of the Club for that year, the Harvard Alumni Bulletin listed him as president of the club and he was said to preside over and give speeches at some club meetings as is detailed in the alumni bulletin. He met with foreign students and world leaders, such as Subhas Chandra Bose, the Indian Nationalist leader, and the Hindu poet Rabindranath Tagore. He became interested in the cause of Indian independence and also helped to establish several centers in Boston for Irish independence. Several sources claim that Albizu Campos, while at Harvard Law School, met with independence leaders from across the world, such as Subhas Chandra Bose, a nationalist leader in India, and Eamon de Valera, of Ireland. However, none of these sources give primary citations to these meetings and the Archives at Harvard University contain no records about these reunions, making the interactions impossible to verify. Also while at Harvard University he allegedly co-founded the university's Knights of Columbus chapter along with other Catholic students and in 1922 he allegedly helped Eamon De Valera draft the 1922 Irish Constitution. No Irish historian supports this claim. This claim opposes the view that Eamon de Valera was staunchly opposed to the treaty, had no role in drafting the Constitution, and rejected it.

Albizu graduated from Harvard Law School in 1921 while simultaneously studying literature, philosophy, Chemical Engineering, and Military Science at Harvard College. He was fluent in six modern and two classical languages: English, Spanish, French, German, Portuguese, Italian, Latin, and ancient Greek.

It is claimed that upon graduation from law school, Albizu Campos was recruited for prestigious positions, including a law clerkship to the U.S. Supreme Court, a diplomatic post with the U.S. State Department, the regional vice-presidency (Caribbean region) of a U.S. agricultural syndicate, and a tenured faculty appointment to the University of Puerto Rico, however, there is no evidence of these offers.

On June 23, 1921, Albizu, facing financial hardship and alleged racism, dropped out of Law School and returned to Puerto Rico, not having taken either Corporations or Evidence. There is a popular story that he had the best grades of his class and that he should have been the valedictorian but was not allowed because of racism, however, records show that his grades were average but not top of his class for either of the years in which he was able to graduate.

Albizu Campos left the United States, took and passed the required two exams in Puerto Rico, and in June 1922 received his law degree by mail. He passed the bar exam and was admitted to the bar in Puerto Rico on February 11, 1924.

=== Marriage ===
In 1922, Albizu married Dr. Laura Meneses, a Peruvian biochemist whom he had met at Harvard University. They had three children named Pedro, Laura, and Rosa Emilia. Albizu also had a child named Héctor out of wedlock with Carmen "Lila" Aponte Roubert.

== Historical context ==
After nearly four hundred years of colonial domination under the Spanish Empire, Puerto Rico finally received its colonial autonomy in 1897 through a Carta de Autonomía (Charter of Autonomy). This Charter of Autonomy was signed by Spanish Prime Minister Práxedes Mateo Sagasta and ratified by the Spanish Cortes.

Despite this, just a few months later, the United States claimed ownership of the island as part of the Treaty of Paris, which concluded the Spanish–American War. Persons opposed to the takeover over the years joined in what became the Puerto Rican Nationalist Party. Their position was that, as a matter of international law, the Treaty of Paris could not empower the Spanish to "give" to the United States what was no longer theirs.

Several years after leaving Puerto Rico, in 1913 Charles Herbert Allen, the former first civilian U.S. governor of the island, became president of the American Sugar Refining Company, the largest of its kind in the world. In 1915, he resigned to reduce his responsibilities, but stayed on the board. This company was later renamed as the Domino Sugar company. According to historian Federico Ribes Tovar, Charles Allen leveraged his governorship of Puerto Rico into a controlling interest over the entire Puerto Rican economy.

== Early career ==
=== Puerto Rican Nationalist Party leadership ===
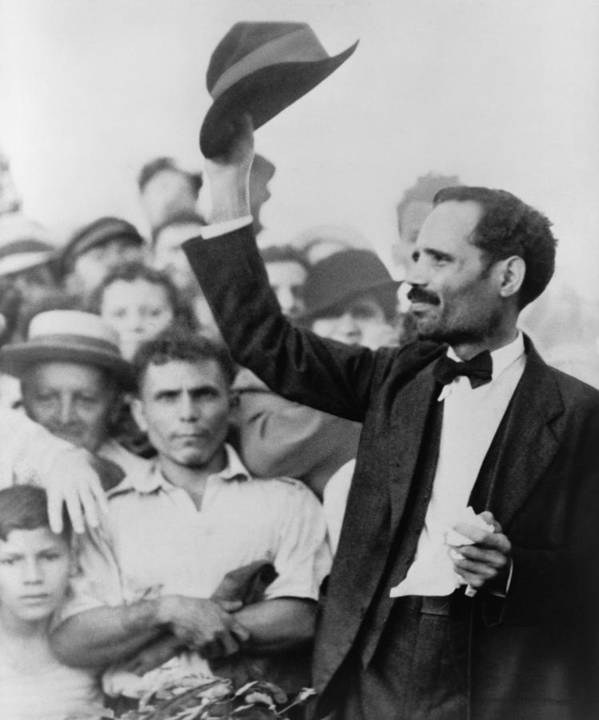
Pedro Albizu Campos in 1936.

Nationalist activists wanted independence from foreign banks, absentee plantation owners, and United States colonial rule. Accordingly, they started organizing in Puerto Rico.

In 1919, José Coll y Cuchí, a member of the Union Party of Puerto Rico, took followers with him to form the Nationalist Association of Puerto Rico in San Juan, to work for independence. They gained legislative approval to repatriate the remains of Ramón Emeterio Betances, the Puerto Rican patriot, from Paris, France.

By the 1920s, two other pro-independence organizations had formed on the Island: the Nationalist Youth and the Independence Association of Puerto Rico. The Independence Association was founded by José S. Alegría, Eugenio Font Suárez and Leopoldo Figueroa in 1920. On September 17, 1922, these three political organizations joined forces and formed the Puerto Rican Nationalist Party. Coll y Cuchi was elected president and José S. Alegría (father of Ricardo Alegría) vice president.

In 1924, Pedro Albizu Campos joined the Puerto Rican Nationalist Party and was elected vice president. In 1927, Albizu Campos traveled to Santo Domingo, Haiti, Cuba, Mexico, Panama, Peru, and Venezuela, seeking support among other Latin Americans for the Puerto Rican Independence movement.

On May 11, 1930, Albizu Campos was elected president of the Puerto Rican Nationalist Party. Albizu and José Coll y Cuchí, the party's first president and founder, disagreed over how the party should be run. Coll y Cuchí left the Party he founded because he could not belong to a party led by someone who preached hate and intolerance. Albizu Campos formed the first Women's Nationalist Committee, in the island municipality of Vieques, Puerto Rico.. However, he was ultra conservative, advocated against co-ed education and no woman was allowed in any Party leadership position from 1930 to 1938.

After being elected party president, Albizu declared: "I never believed in numbers. Independence will instead be achieved by the intensity of those that devote themselves totally to the Nationalist ideal." Under the slogan, "La Patria es valor y sacrificio" (The Homeland is valor and sacrifice), a new campaign of national affirmation was carried out. Albizu Campos' vision of sacrifice was integrated with his Catholic faith.

=== Accusation against Dr. Cornelius P. Rhoads ===
In 1932, Albizu published a letter accusing Dr. Cornelius P. Rhoads, an American pathologist with the Rockefeller Institute, of killing Puerto Rican patients in San Juan's Presbyterian Hospital as part of his medical research. Albizu Campos had been given an unmailed letter by Rhoads addressed to a colleague, found after Rhoads returned to the United States.

Part of what Rhoads wrote, in a letter to his friend which began by complaining about another's job appointment, included the following:

I can get a damn fine job here and am tempted to take it. It would be ideal except for the Porto Ricans. They are beyond doubt the dirtiest, laziest, most degenerate and thievish race of men ever inhabiting this sphere. It makes you sick to inhabit the same island with them. They are even lower than Italians. What the island needs is not public health work but a tidal wave or something to totally exterminate the population. It might then be livable. I have done my best to further the process of extermination by killing off 8 and transplanting cancer into several more. The latter has not resulted in any fatalities so far ... The matter of consideration for the patients' welfare plays no role here – in fact all physicians take delight in the abuse and torture of the unfortunate subjects.

Albizu sent copies of the letter to the League of Nations, the Pan American Union, the American Civil Liberties Union, newspapers, embassies, and the Vatican. He also sent copies of the Rhoads letter to the media, and published his own letter in the Porto Rico Progress. He used it as an opportunity to attack United States imperialism, writing:

The mercantile monopoly is backed by the financial monopoly ... The United States have mortgaged the country to their own financial interests. The military intervention destroyed agriculture. It changed the country into a huge sugar plantation ..." Albizu Campos accused Rhoads and the United States of trying to exterminate the native population, saying, "Evidently, submissive people coming under the North American empire, under the shadow of its flag, are taken ill and die. The facts confirm absolutely a system of extermination." He went on, "It [the Rockefeller Foundation] has in fact been working out a plan to exterminate our people by inoculating patients unfortunate enough to go to them with virus of incurable diseases such as cancer.

A scandal erupted. Rhoads had already returned to New York. Governor James R. Beverley of Puerto Rico and his attorney general Ramón Quiñones, as well as Puerto Rican medical doctors Morales and Otero appointed thereby, conducted an investigation of the more than 250 cases treated during the period of Rhoads' work at Presbyterian Hospital. The Rockefeller Foundation also conducted their own investigation. Rhoads said he had written the letter in anger after he found his car vandalized, and it was intended "as a joke" in private with his colleague. An investigation concluded that he had conducted his research and treatment of Puerto Ricans appropriately. When the matter was revisited in 2002, again no evidence was found of medical mistreatment. The American Association for Cancer Research (AACR) considered the letter offensive enough to remove Rhoads' name from a prize established to honor his lifelong work in cancer research.

The Nationalist Party made the letter public and used it to support their claim that there was an extermination plan against Puerto Ricans. Albizu Campos even sent this letter and Baldoni’s sworn statement to the German Foreign Minister Konstantin Von Neurath. Rhoads left the island abruptly and unsuccessfully tried to claim that this letter was "a fantastic composition written in jest for personal entertainment." Regardless, the letter was in poor taste and revealed serious ethnic and cultural biases. Whether it was meant as a joke or not, this letter provoked widespread outrage and provided the Nationalists with ammunition to justify their claims. However, no evidence has emerged in the last 94 years to support any of the alleged claims.

=== Early Nationalist efforts ===
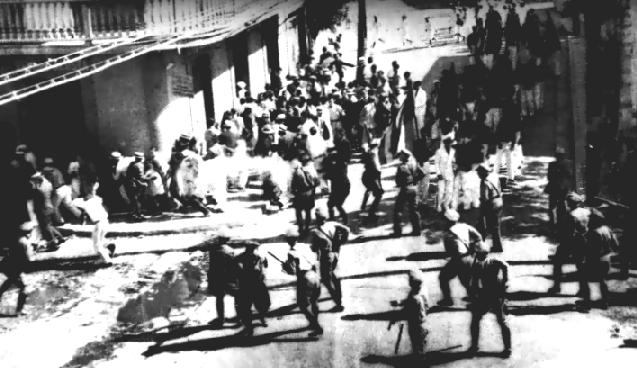
The Ponce Massacre, 1937. Carlos Torres Morales, a photo journalist for the newspaper El Imparcial, took this when the shooting began.

In December 1931, as he was developing his paramilitary group, Albizu Campos published The Decalogue of the Young Fascist. The Decalogue of the Young Fascist served as a guide for young Puerto Ricans who wore black shirts with a cross patch on their shoulders. It was written as if it were the Ten Commandments, starting with the command to prioritize God and the Fatherland above all else. For fascists, God and the Fatherland took precedence over family. With this Fascist Decalogue, Albizu Campos demanded complete devotion to the Fatherland. A cadet who was not prepared to serve The Teacher unconditionally, or prepared to give body and soul for the country fully, did not have the right to wear the black shirt. The introductory paragraph, Albizu Campos tells the cadets that “to realize what every young fascist should be and do; it is enough to examine the new ‘Decalogue’ that the Nationalist Party of Puerto Rico has just imposed on them.

The 1932 general elections were held under the United States colonial government. President Franklyn Delano Roosevelt appointed the governor and San Juan’s commissioners. All other positions were elected. In 1932, two newly formed major parties participated in the elections. The Liberal Party was a reorganization of Antonio R. Barceló’s Union Party and advocated for independence. The pro- independence Liberal Party did something that no one before or after has been able to achieve, as it counted on the support of approximately 45% of the popular vote. The Socialist Party and the pro-business Republican Union Party might have been at odds, but they both were pro-statehood and recognized that the only way they could defeat the pro-independence liberals was by forming a coalition. In an attempt to debilitate the Liberal Party, the republicans helped Albizu Campos register the Nationalist Party for the 1932 election. The Liberal Party obtained 170,168 votes, but the coalition obtained 38,064 more. The Nationalist Party only obtained 5,257 votes. In 1934, Albizu Campos led a failed sugar cane workers' strike. To avoid collaborating with the Free Federation of Workers, Albizu Campos established the Association of Puerto Rican Workers, which ultimately proved a disaster. This new nationalist workers' organization faced significant challenges in recruiting members to lead the strike efforts. Ultimately, the strike was led by municipal nationalist board members, attorneys, students, and a dentist. Not only did Albizu Campos set aside the Federation of Workers, but he also turned them into enemies by criticizing its leaders, calling them the leaders of a federation of questionable legitimacy. The leaders of the Free Federation of Workers did not stay passive. They had plenty of ammunition and openly mocked the nationalists’ involvement in the labor dispute. A Federation leader addressed a large crowd at a rally, saying that the nationalists, who had been “defeated in other fields of social and political activity, " tried to fish in troubled waters, but they were disappointed. They cast their nets and could only catch a lonely crab: a crab named ‘embarrassment.”

The Nationalist movement was intensified by some of its members being killed by police during unrest at the University of Puerto Rico campus in 1935, in what is misnamed "Río Piedras Massacre".• Although it was not unusual for Albizu Campos to insult people during his speeches, he gave two radio broadcasts in which he insulted the university students, who then organized a student assembly to declare him “Persona Non Grata.” Before the student assembly started, two of Albizu Campos’ close associates arrived at the university campus, hung around where the student assembly was expected to occur, and watched the events as they unfolded. One was Albizu Campos’ personal secretary, and the other was the new Party Treasurer. Neither of them was a student. The Santurce Division of the nationalist paramilitary group was activated and the division leaders Colonel Ramón S. Pagán and Lieutenant José E. Santiago Barea were to lead the attack. While the two henchmen watched the area, Colonel Ramón S. Pagán and three cadets got into his car and drove from Santurce to the university campus in Rio Piedras. None of them were students, but they were all armed with guns. Nationalist lieutenant José E. Santiago Barea armed himself with a loaded pistol, two extra magazines, and a bomb and went to the campus area and stayed outside the university campus perimeter. He may have initially arrived with Pagán. Pagán drove the armed group in and out of the university campus several times while waiting for the student assembly to begin. Two police officers stopped the car and requested Pagan's driver's license. After refusing to comply, the nationalists were taken to the police station. On the way, Pagan stopped the car and started the shootout where initially three nationalists died, and one officer was wounded.

The Nationalist Party held its 1935 General Assembly on December 8. It had only been three months since the Nazis held their infamous Nuremberg Rally, where they officially announced their racial laws targeting the Jewish community. The Nuremberg rally theme was who was a true German and who was not. The audience at the Campo Alegre Theater rose and applauded passionately as Pedro Albizu Campos was introduced. He discussed the year's activities and noted that 1936 held special significance for Puerto Rico, as it enabled Puerto Ricans to define what it means to be a Puerto Rican and what it does not mean. Albizu Campos made it clear that anyone who is not with him is an enemy of the Fatherland. He told the crowd that anyone who does not actively defend Puerto Rico's independence with their life and property is not a patriot.. Midway through his speech, Albizu Campos issued a clear threat to all North Americans living on the Island. He said that American mothers and the children of American fathers residing on the island need not worry about their safety. However, he added, “On the day of the revolution, we will make them prisoners.”

In 1936, Hiram Rosado and Elías Beauchamp, two high-ranking officers of the Cadets of the Republic, the Nationalist fascist organization, assassinated the chief of police, Colonel E. Francis Riggs. After their arrest, they were killed without a trial at police headquarters in San Juan. This assassination is ironic as E. Francis Riggs was a very influential Washington DC banker and a supporter of independence for Puerto Rico.

In 1937, the nationalist paramilitary group attempted to conduct a march through the streets of the city of Ponce, without having a city permit. As the officers stopped the march, two nationalists initiated a shootout, killing one officer, and the police responded with a barrage that resulted in many casualties. This incident is known today as the Ponce Massacre. at Other police killed marchers and bystanders at a parade in the Ponce massacre (1937). The Nationalists claimed these showed the violence which the United States was prepared to use in order to maintain its colonial regime in Puerto Rico. Historians Manuel Maldonado-Denis and César Ayala believe the motive for this repression, especially during the Great Depression, was because United States business interests were earning such enormous profits by this colonial arrangement.

The Schutzstaffel was the notorious elite unit established by Adolf Hitler in Nazi Germany and was commanded by Reichsführer Heinrich Himmler. This organization was unwaveringly loyal to Adolf Hitler and was commonly known as the SS or the Black Shirts. One component of the SS was the Gestapo. During World War II, it was the SS that ran all the concentration camps and the Einsatzgruppen killing units. They were responsible for the deaths of millions of innocent people and committed numerous other crimes against humanity. The Das Schwarze Korps was the SS's official propaganda newspaper. On February 2, 1939, Das Schwarze Korps published an article defending Puerto Rican nationalists. In their article, the SS accused Franklin Delano Roosevelt of resorting to terrorism in Puerto Rico, similar to the Russian secret police. “Those who have a glass roof should not throw stones…the terrorist methods used by the American government, along with the police, to suppress the nationalist leaders fighting for Puerto Rico's independence are only comparable to the actions of the OGPU (Soviet secret police).”

=== First arrest ===
After these events, on April 3, 1936, a federal grand jury submitted an indictment against Albizu Campos, Juan Antonio Corretjer, Luis F. Velázquez, Clemente Soto Vélez and the following members of the cadets: Erasmo Velázquez, Julio H. Velázquez, Rafael Ortiz Pacheco, Juan Gallardo Santiago, and Pablo Rosado Ortiz. They were charged with sedition and other violations of federal law proscribing subversive activities.

Clemente Soto Vélez, Juan Antonio Corretjer and Pedro Albizu Campos (L to R), immediately before their trial and federal imprisonment.

The prosecution based some of its charges on the Nationalists' creation and organization of the Liberating Army of Puerto Rico. The prosecutors said that the military tactics which the cadets were taught were for the purpose of overthrowing the Government of the United States. A jury of seven Puerto Ricans and five Americans was unable to reach a unanimous verdict, voting 7-to-5 for acquittal. Following the hung jury, Judge Robert A. Cooper permitted a retrial. The second jury was composed of ten Americans and two Puerto Ricans. Following trial, this jury concluded that the defendants were guilty.

In 1937, a group of lawyers, including a young Gilberto Concepción de Gracia, appealed the case, but the 1st Circuit U.S. Court of Appeals, which held appellate jurisdiction, upheld the verdict. Albizu Campos and the other Nationalist leaders were sentenced to the Federal penitentiary in Atlanta.

In 1939, United States Congressman Vito Marcantonio, strongly criticized the proceedings, calling the trial a "frame-up" and "one of the blackest pages in the history of American jurisprudence." In his speech Five Years of Tyranny in Puerto Rico, Congressman Marcantonio said that Albizu's jury had been profoundly prejudiced since it had been hand-picked by the prosecuting attorney Cecil Snyder. According to Marcantonio, the jury consisted of people "...who had expressed publicly bias and hatred for the defendants." He said Snyder had been told that "the Department of Justice would back him until he did get a conviction."

Marcantonio argued for Puerto Rican rights, saying "As long as Puerto Rico remains part of the United States, Puerto Rico must have the same freedom, the same civil liberties, and the same justice which our forefathers laid down for us. Only a complete and immediate unconditional pardon will, in a very small measure, right this historical wrong."

In 1943, Albizu Campos became seriously ill and had to be interned at the Columbus Hospital of New York. He stayed there until nearly the end of his sentence. In 1947, after eleven years of imprisonment, Albizu was released; he returned to Puerto Rico. Within a short period of time, he began preparing for an armed struggle against the United States' plan to turn Puerto Rico into a "commonwealth" of the United States.

== Later career ==
=== Passage of the Gag Law ===
In 1948, the Puerto Rican Senate passed Law 53, also called the Ley de la Mordaza (Gag Law). At the time, members of the Partido Popular Democrático (Popular Democratic Party), or PPD, occupied almost all the Senate seats, and Luis Muñoz Marín presided over the chamber.

The bill was signed into law on June 10, 1948, by the United States-appointed governor of Puerto Rico Jesús T. Piñero. It closely resembled the anti-communist Smith Law passed in the United States.

The law made it illegal to advocate the overthrow of the U.S. government, although it is commonly wrongly asserted to have made it illegal to own or display a Puerto Rican flag, even in one's own private residence. It limited speech against the United States government or in favor of Puerto Rican independence and prohibited one to print, publish, sell or exhibit any material intended to paralyze or destroy the insular government or to organize any society, group or assembly of people with a similar destructive intent. Anyone accused and found guilty of disobeying the law could be sentenced to ten years imprisonment, a fine of $10,000 (US), or both.

Dr. Leopoldo Figueroa, then a member of the Partido Estadista Puertorriqueño (Puerto Rican Statehood Party) and the only non-PPD member of the Puerto Rico House of Representatives, spoke out against the law, saying that it was repressive and in direct violation of the First Amendment of the United States Constitution, which guarantees Freedom of Speech. Figueroa noted that since Puerto Ricans had been granted United States citizenship they were covered by its constitutional protections.

=== 1950s uprisings and second arrest ===
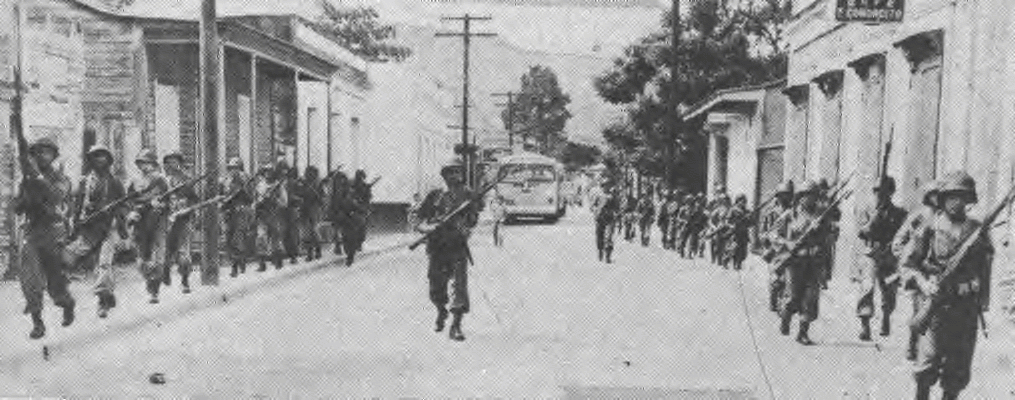
The National Guard occupy Jayuya.

Pedro Albizu Campos was jailed again after the October 30, 1950, Nationalist revolts, known as the Puerto Rican Nationalist Party Revolts of the 1950s, in various Puerto Rican cities and towns against United States rule. Among the more notable of the revolts was the Jayuya uprising, where a group of Puerto Rican Nationalists, under the leadership of Blanca Canales, held the town of Jayuya for three days; the Utuado uprising which culminated in what is known as the "Utuado Massacre"; and the attack on La Fortaleza (the Puerto Rican governor's mansion) during the Nationalist attack of San Juan.

On October 31, police officers and National Guardsmen surrounded Salón Boricua, a barbershop in Santurce. Believing that a group of Nationalists were inside the shop, they opened fire. The only person in the shop was Albizu Campos' personal barber, Vidal Santiago Díaz. Santiago Díaz fought alone against the attackers for three hours and received five bullet wounds, including one in the head. The entire gunfight was transmitted "live" via the radio airwaves, and was heard all over the island. Overnight Santiago Díaz, the barber who survived an armed attack by forty police and National Guardsmen, became a legend throughout Puerto Rico.

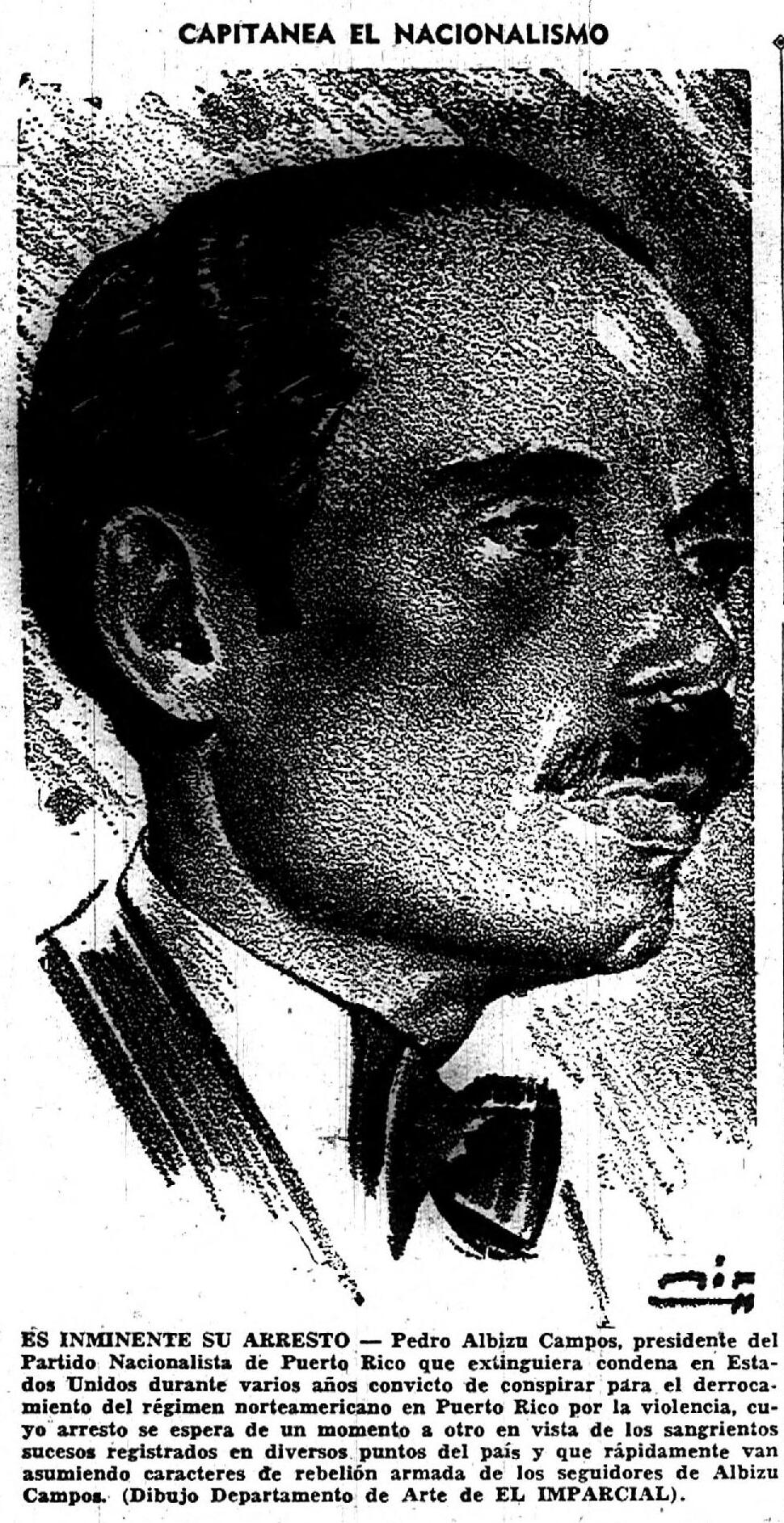
Illustration of Albizu published in El Imparcial on October 31, 1950, declaring that his arrest was "imminent"

During the revolt, Albizu was at the Nationalist Party's headquarters in Old San Juan, which also served as his residence. That day he was accompanied by Juan José Muñoz Matos, Doris Torresola Roura (cousin of Blanca Canales and sister of Griselio Torresola), and Carmen María Pérez Roque. The occupants of the building were surrounded by the police and the National Guard who, without warning, fired their weapons. Doris Torresola, who was shot and wounded, was carried out during a ceasefire by Muñoz Matos and Pérez Roque. Alvaro Rivera Walker, a friend of Pedro Albizu Campos, somehow made his way to the Nationalist leader. He stayed with Albizu Campos until the next day when they were attacked with gas. Rivera Walker then raised a white towel he attached to a pole and surrendered. All the Nationalists, including Albizu, were arrested.

On November 1, 1950, Nationalists Oscar Collazo and Griselio Torresola attacked Blair House in Washington, D.C., where president Harry S. Truman was staying while the White House was being renovated. During the attack on the president, Torresola and a policeman, Private Leslie Coffelt, were killed.

Because of this assassination attempt, Pedro Albizu Campos was immediately attacked at his home. After a shootout with the police, Albizu Campos was arrested and sentenced to eighty years in prison. Over the next few days, 3,000 independence supporters were arrested all over the island.

=== Lolita Lebrón and third arrest ===
Albizu was pardoned in 1953 by then-governor Luis Muñoz Marín but the pardon was revoked the following year after the 1954 United States Capitol shooting incident, when four Puerto Rican Nationalists, led by Lolita Lebrón, opened fire from the gallery of the Capitol Building in Washington, D.C.

Though in ill health, Pedro Albizu Campos was arrested when Lolita Lebrón, Rafael Cancel Miranda, Andrés Figueroa Cordero, and Irvin Flores, unfurled a Puerto Rican flag and opened fire on the members of the 83rd Congress on March 1, 1954, with the intention of capturing world-wide attention to the cause of Puerto Rican independence.

Ruth Mary Reynolds, the American Nationalist, went to the defense of Albizu Campos and the four Nationalists involved in the shooting incident with the aid of the American League for Puerto Rico's Independence.

=== Later years and death ===
During his imprisonment, Albizu suffered deteriorating health. He alleged that he was the subject of human radiation experiments in prison and said that he could see colored rays bombarding him. When he wrapped wet towels around his head in order to shield himself from the radiation, the prison guards ridiculed him as El Rey de las Toallas (The King of the Towels).

Officials suggested that Pedro Albizu Campos was suffering from mental illness, but other prisoners at La Princesa prison including Francisco Matos Paoli, Roberto Díaz and Juan Jaca, claimed that they felt the effects of radiation on their own bodies as well.

Orlando Daumy, a radiologist and president of the Cuban Cancer Association, traveled to Puerto Rico to examine him. From his direct physical examination of Albizu Campos, Dr. Daumy reached three specific conclusions:

1) that the sores on Albizu Campos were produced by radiation burns
2) that his symptoms corresponded to those of a person who had received intense radiation,
3) that wrapping himself in wet towels was the best way to diminish the intensity of the rays.

The FBI investigated any doctors who planned to visit and diagnose Pedro Albizu Campos. Dr. Nacine Hanoka (Miami Beach, FL), was thoroughly investigated. In one FBI memo to J. Edgar Hoover regarding Dr. Hanoka, an instruction near the end of the memo stated "The Miami office is requested to identify Dr. HANOKA, determine whether he made a trip to Puerto Rico since 9/30/53, and furnish any subversive information concerning him."

In 1956, Albizu suffered a stroke in prison and was transferred to San Juan's Presbyterian Hospital under police guard.

On November 15, 1964, on the brink of death, Pedro Albizu Campos was pardoned by Governor Luis Muñoz Marín. He died on April 21, 1965. More than 75,000 Puerto Ricans were part of a procession that accompanied his body for burial in the Old San Juan Cemetery.

== Legacy ==
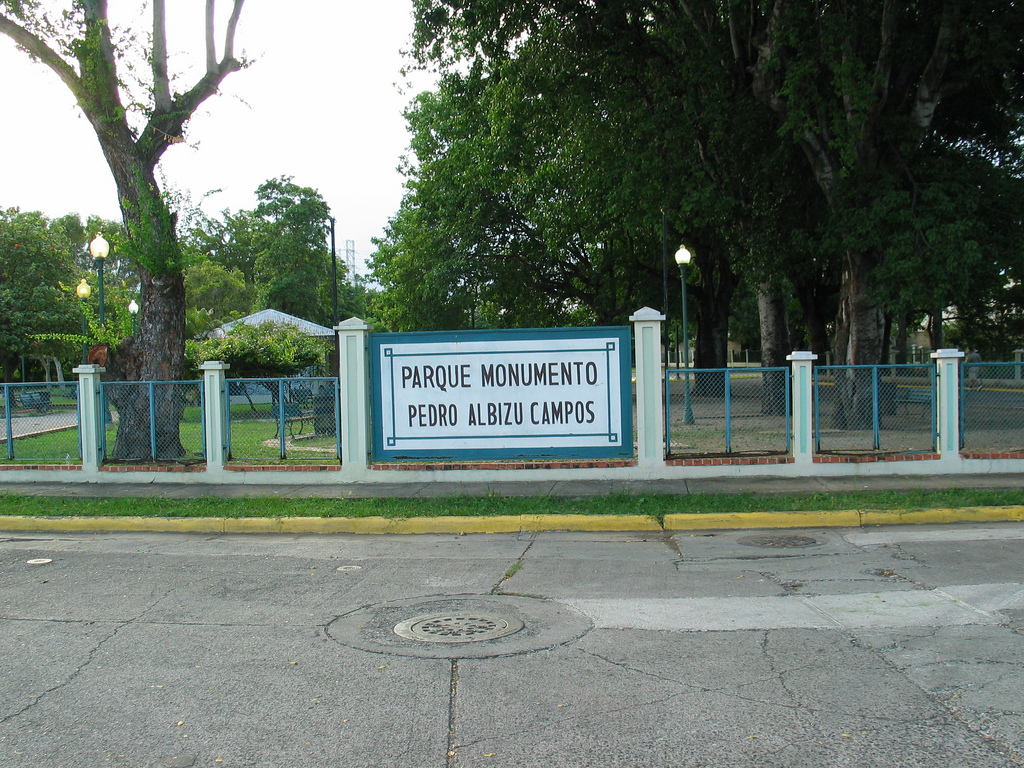
The Pedro Albizu Campos Park built at his birthplace: the Tenerias community of Barrio Machuelo Abajo, Ponce, Puerto Rico.

Pedro Albizu Campos's legacy is the subject of discussion among supporters and detractors. Lolita Lebrón called him "Puerto Rico's most visionary leader" and nationalists consider him "one of the island's greatest patriots of the 20th century." In describing his legacy, social scientist Juan Manuel Carrión wrote that "Albizu still represents a forceful challenge to the very fabric of [Puerto Rico's] colonial political order." His followers state that Albizu's political and military actions served as a primer for positive change in Puerto Rico, including the improvement of labor conditions for peasants and workers, a more accurate assessment of the colonial relationship between Puerto Rico and the United States, and an awareness by the political establishment in Washington, D.C. of this colonial relationship. Supporters state that the legacy is that of an exemplary sacrifice for the building of the Puerto Rican nation ... a legacy of resistance to colonial rule. His critics say that he "failed to attract and offer concrete solutions to the struggling poor and working class people and thus was unable to spread the revolution to the masses."

The revival of public observance of the Grito de Lares and its significant icons was a result of Albizu Campos's efforts as the leader of the Puerto Rican Nationalist Party.

=== FBI files on Albizu Campos ===
In the 2000s, Federal Bureau of Investigation (FBI) files released under the Freedom of Information Act, revealed that the San Juan FBI office coordinated with FBI offices in New York, Chicago and other cities, in a decades-long surveillance of Albizu and Puerto Ricans who had contact or communication with him. These documents are viewable online, including some as recent as 1965.

== Honors ==
External audio
- You may listen to one of the speeches made in Spanish by Albizu Campos on YouTube
- and view a portion of the Albizu Documentary Trailer on YouTube made in English.

Albizu Campos has been the subject of hundreds of books and countless articles. He has also been honored both in the United States and in Puerto Rico in many ways:

- In Chicago, an alternative high school is named the Dr. Pedro Albizu Campos High School.
- La Casa de Don Pedro in Newark, New Jersey is named after him.
- In New York City the Campos Plaza Community Center and housing project in Manhattan are named after him.
- In New York City, Public School 161 in Harlem is named after him.
- In Puerto Rico, there are streets in most municipalities named after him.
- In Ponce, there is a Pedro Albizu Campos Park and lifesize statue dedicated to his memory. Every September 12, his contributions to Puerto Rico are remembered at this park on the celebration of his birthday.
- In Salinas, there is a "Plaza Monumento Don Pedro Albizu Campos", a plaza and 9-foot statue dedicated to his memory. It was dedicated on January 11, 2013, the birth day of Eugenio María de Hostos, another Puerto Rican who struggled for Puerto Rico's independence. Quite unique among Puerto Rican thought, the plaza-monument was erected and dedicated by a municipal government of the opposite (statehood) political ideology as that of Albizu Campos.
- In 1993, Chicago alderman Billy Ocasio, in supporting a statue of Albizu Campos in Humboldt Park, likened him to such American leaders as Patrick Henry, Chief Crazy Horse, John Brown, Frederick Douglass, and W. E. B. Du Bois.

== Gallery ==
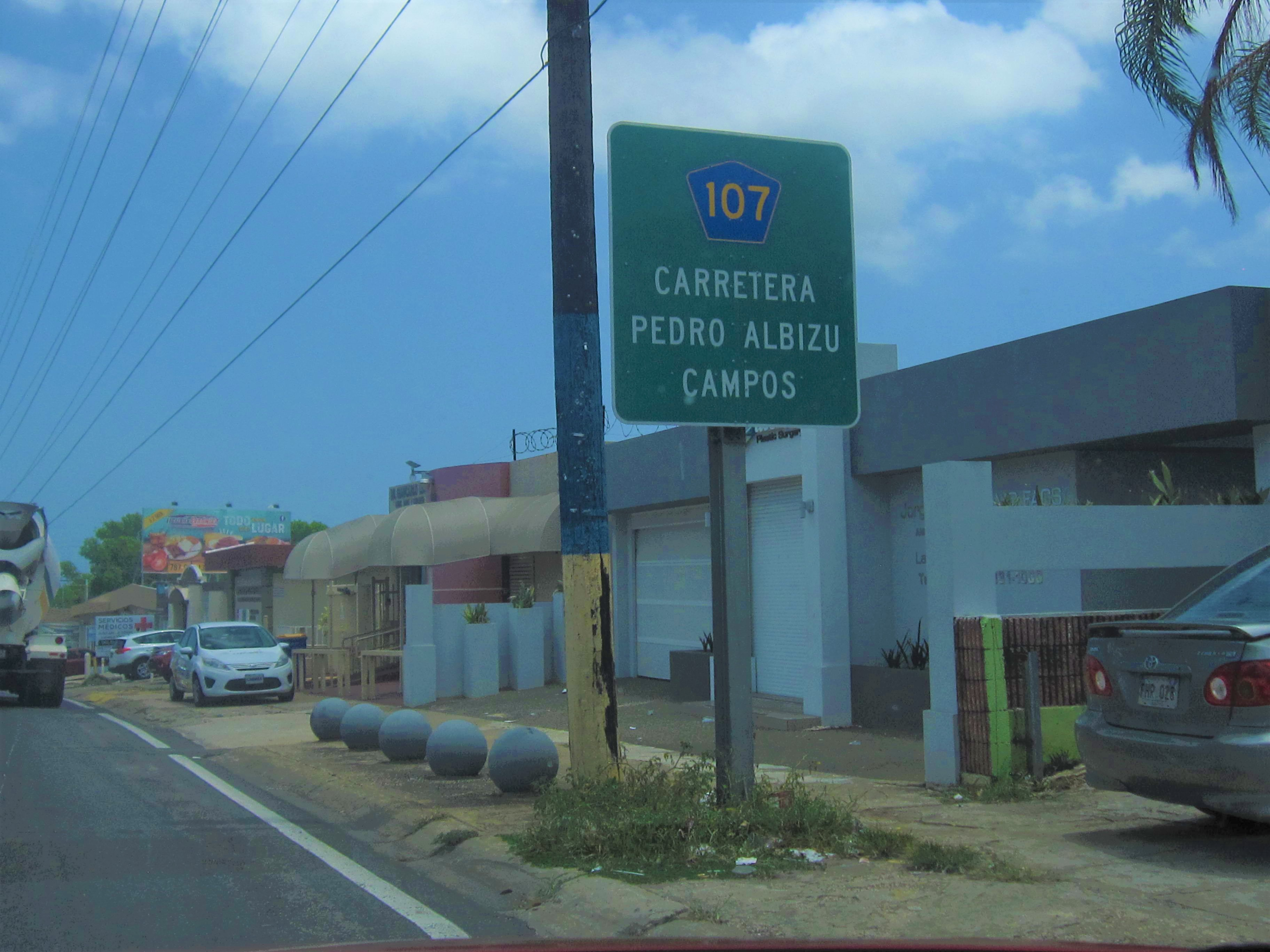
Highway in Aguadilla, Puerto Rico

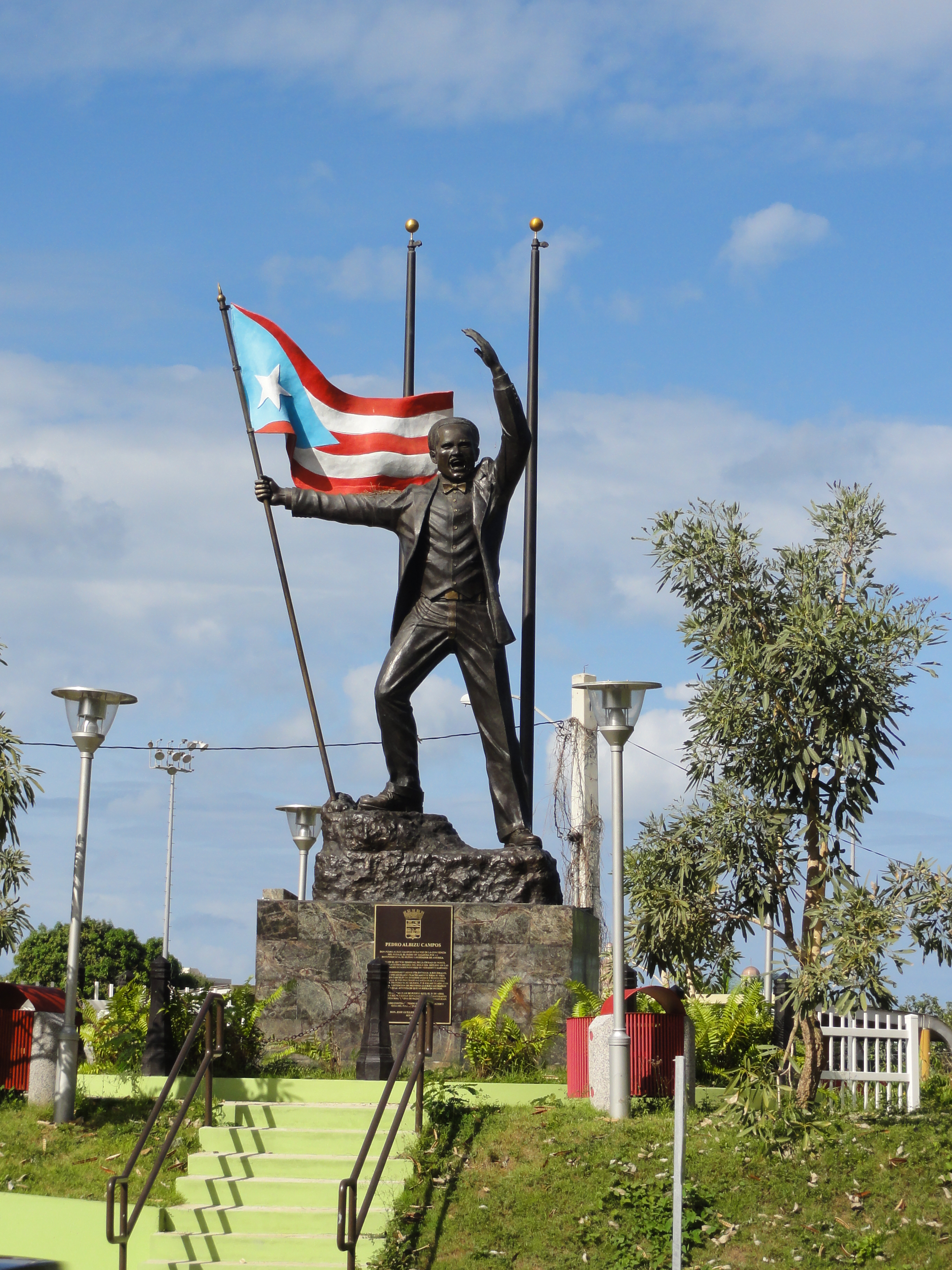
Statue of Pedro Albizu Campos in Mayagüez

== See also ==
- Puerto Ricans in World War I
- San Juan Nationalist revolt
- Puerto Rican Independence Party
