= Rinker Group =

Australian building products company

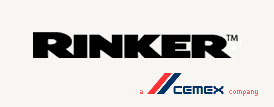
- Company type: Private (subsidiary of Cemex)
- Industry: Cement
- Founded: 1926
- Founder: Marshall Rinker; A.V. Hansen
- Defunct: 2009
- Successor: Cemex
- Headquarters: Australia
- Area served: worldwide
- Products: Cement; Ready-mix concrete Construction aggregates
- Number of employees: 14,000 (2003)
- Website: (Formerly) www.rinker.com.au

The Rinker Group was an Australian-headquartered multinational building products company. Before its acquisition by Cemex, it was listed on both the Australian Securities Exchange and the New York Stock Exchange.

The business was on-sold by Cemex to Holcim in 2009 and now operates under the banner of Holcim (Australia) Pty Ltd.

== Divisions ==
Rinker operated three major divisions:

- Readymix, which produced and delivered bulk concrete and quarried rock and sand for the building industry for the Australian market. Readymix had established subsidiaries in China, supplying concrete for the cities of Tianjin and Qingdao.
- Humes, a manufacturer of concrete products including pipe, rail track materials, precast concrete bridges, culverts and the like, for the Australian market. Humes is still a major player in this market as a subsidiary of Holcim Australia.
- Rinker Materials Corporation of West Palm Beach produces several concrete, aggregate, and other heavy building products similar to the Australian product line in several US states, notably including Florida and Arizona. In Florida, for instance, it operated under the name "Florida Materials", and ran a substantial retail network for these materials and other building products. About 80% of Rinker's revenue and profits came from its US operations.

== History ==
Rinker Group was established as a separate entity in 2003 through its demerger from CSR Limited. CSR had earlier purchased Rinker Materials, which was founded by Marshall "Doc" Rinker and A.V. Hansen in 1926. The company has approximately 14,000 employees and as of 2004 has sales of around US$3,700 million and a market capitalization of about US$5 billion. Its net profit was US$492 million in the 2003-04 financial year.

In the Companies Target Statement over Cemex's takeover bid they showed the group's result from 98 (they were at this time owned by Commonwealth Sugar Refineries). They revealed that the compound average growth rate for EBITDA is 24.8 while sales grew at 14.3% average compound. Taking these figures it's evident that in nine fiscal years, their EBITDA margin has doubled from 14% to 28%. This means on average over the last 9 years 32.9% of any amount that sales grow by (14.3%) will result in 32.9% sales growth directly translated into EBITDA.

Rinker Group was acquired by CEMEX, the world's third-largest cement producer, through its subsidiary CEMEX Australia Pty Ltd. in a US$14.2 billion takeover bid. As of June 2007, CEMEX owned a 67.3% stake in Rinker Group. The chief executive officer was David Clarke, who had long worked in CSR's heavy building products division. The chairman of the board of directors was Hector Medina, executive vice-president of CEMEX. The other board members were also nominees from CEMEX.

CEMEX Australia was sold to Holcim in June 2009 as part of an AUD 2 billion takeover bid and is now known as Holcim Australia. The deal included the Readymix and Humes business units and CEMEX's 25% stake in Cement Australia (one of Australia's major cement manufacturers) but did not include the US-based Rinker Materials Corporation. In 2016, Cemex sold its Rinker Materials pipe business to Quikrete.

The company's corporate headquarters are located in Chatswood, a Sydney suburb.
