= 1985 Puerto Rico floods =

Flood event that took place in Puerto Rico

1985 Puerto Rico flood
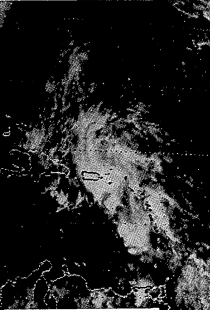
- Satellite image of the tropical system near Puerto Rico
- Date: October 1985
- Location: Puerto Rico
- Deaths: 180
- Property damage: $125 million (1985 USD) (Note: All damage totals are in 1985 United States dollars.)

The 1985 Puerto Rico floods produced showers and thunderstorms across the island and the deadliest single landslide on record on United States territory, that killed at least 130 people in the Mameyes neighborhood of barrio Portugués Urbano in Ponce. The floods were the result of a westward-moving tropical wave that emerged off the coast of Africa on September 29. The system moved into the Caribbean Sea on October 5 and produced heavy rains across Puerto Rico, peaking at 31.67 in (804 mm) in Toro Negro State Forest. Two stations broke their 24-hour rainfall records set in 1899. The rains caused severe flooding in the southern half of Puerto Rico, which isolated towns, washed out roads, and caused rivers to exceed their banks. In addition to the deadly landslide in Mameyes, the floods washed out a bridge in Santa Isabel that killed several people. The storm system caused about $125 million in damage and 180 deaths, which prompted a presidential disaster declaration. The tropical wave later spawned Tropical Storm Isabel.

== Meteorological history ==
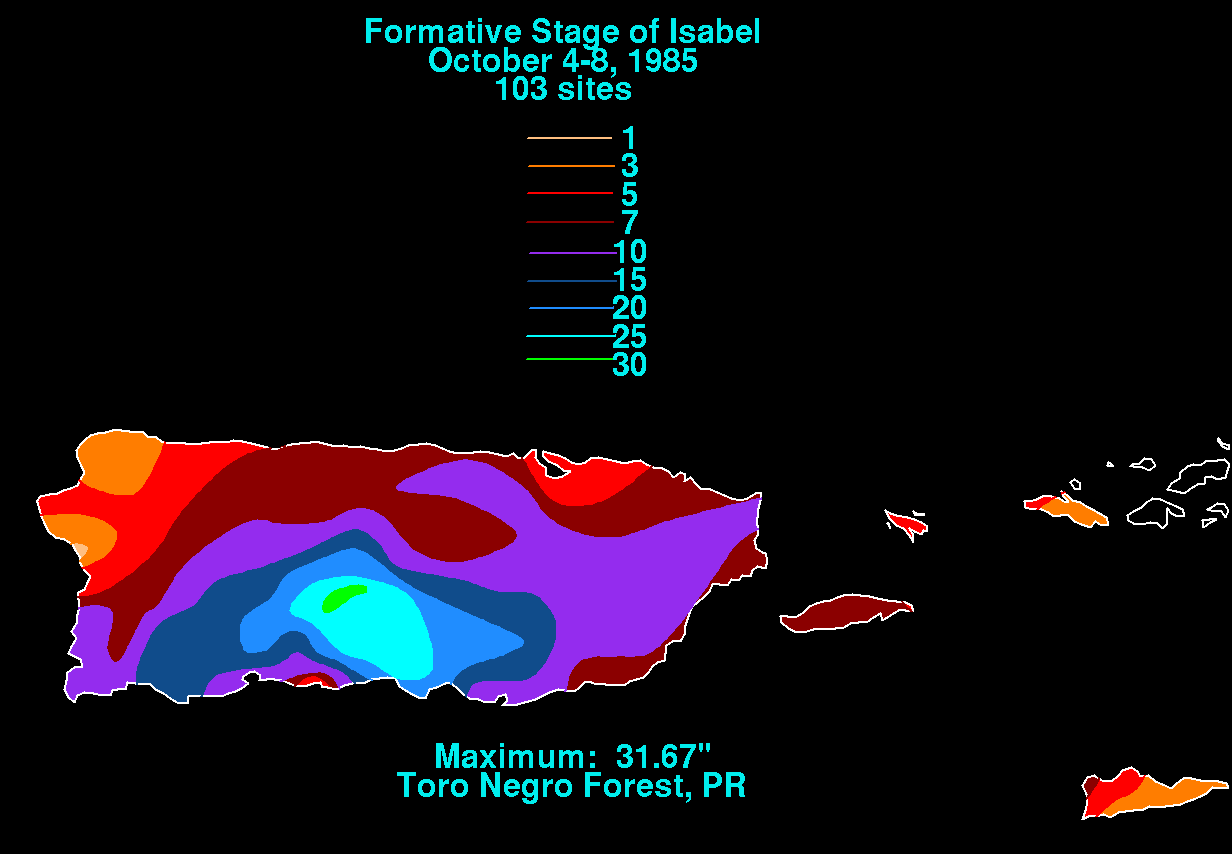
Rainfall totals across Puerto Rico

The tropical wave (Note: A tropical wave is a trough that moves along the trade winds.) that caused the flooding moved off the west coast of Africa on September 29. Moving westward, the system entered the eastern Caribbean Sea on October 5, although rainfall began spreading across Puerto Rico the day prior. The wave's associated convection, or thunderstorms, were amplified by an upper-level trough to its west. It was developing into a tropical cyclone while it moved across Puerto Rico. When the system's rainbands reached the mountains of southern Puerto Rico, it produced torrential rainfall, and additional precipitation occurred owing to the system's slow movement.

The most intense rainfall occurred on October 6, and on that day two stations recorded 24-hour precipitation totals exceeding 23 in (580 mm). These totals broke the 24-hour rainfall records set during the 1899 San Ciriaco hurricane, and amounted to nearly half of the annual precipitation totals. The town of Peñuelas reported very high rainfall totals in a short amount of time, including 2.75 in (70 mm) in one hour and 5.5 in (140 mm) in two hours. The highest rainfall total in Puerto Rico was 31.67 in (804 mm) in Toro Negro State Forest. Rainfall spread across the island, and the southern half of Puerto Rico experienced totals of over 10 in (250 mm). Rainfall totals over 7 in (180 mm) spread across the United States Virgin Islands. The tropical wave later spawned a low-pressure area north of Hispaniola that became Tropical Storm Isabel on October 7, a day before the rains subsided in Puerto Rico. The storm ultimately struck Florida before dissipating on October 15.

== Impact ==
Across Puerto Rico, heavy rains from the weather system caused river flooding and landslides. The rains most significantly affected the municipalities of Ponce, Juana Díaz, Santa Isabel, and Coamo. Several stations reported 100 year flooding, just five months after similar floods affected the island. The floods in May generally affected the northern portion of the island, and the October event generally affected southern Puerto Rico, although the town of Barceloneta experienced floods in both events. Several rivers exceeded their banks, and the Toa Vaca reservoir filled to its capacity for the second time since it was constructed in 1972.

A flooded creek in Quebrada del Agua, near Ponce, killed 16 people. Flooding washed away the westbound bridge over the Río Coamo near Santa Isabel along San Juan–Ponce highway. At least six cars drove into an unlit 35 ft (11 m) gap in the road, killing 29 people. Four of the deaths were police officers who were trying to rescue a family from a car that was washed away. At least six bridges were washed out across the island. The floods left about 32,000 people without power, and some towns were isolated. The floods shut down 11 water filtration plants and 13 sewage treatment plants, which left 16 municipalities temporarily without water. Across Puerto Rico, the floods damaged 1,700 houses and destroyed another 1,300. About 50,000 people had to leave their houses for shelter across Puerto Rico. Damage was estimated at $125 million (1985 USD), and throughout the territory, the floods killed 180 people, 150 of whom lived in Ponce. Officials considered the system to be the "worst disaster" on the island since Hurricane Donna in 1960.

Two landslides occurred near Peñuelas, collectively damaging or destroying 13 buildings.

=== Barrio Mameyes ===
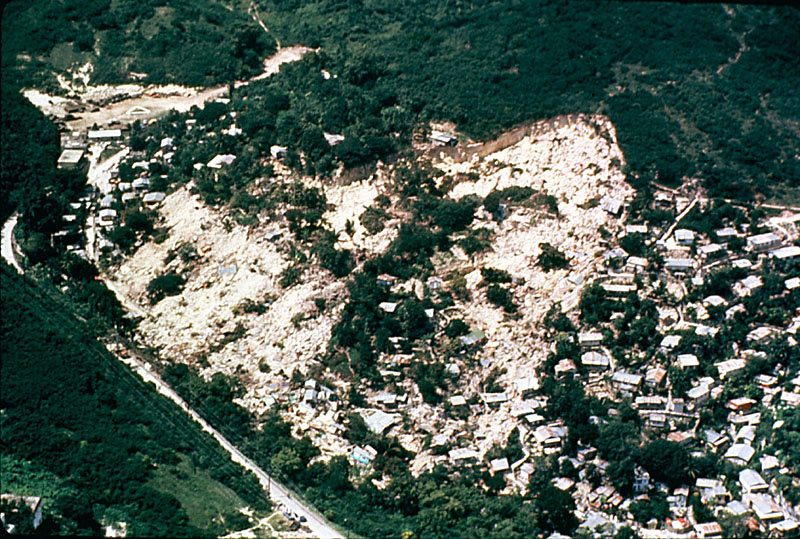
Image of the landslide in Mameyes

Saturated soils caused mudslides throughout Puerto Rico, although only one resulted in loss of life. In the hillside community of Mameyes, within Ponce, there was a block slide at around 3:00 am local time on October 7. A large slab of sandstone detached from a hill, moving about 250,000 cu yd (190,000 m^{3}) of material down the hill. The intense rainfall triggered the landslide, although pre-existing conditions such as a leaking water main and poor sewage flow likely contributed to the event. The landslide destroyed about 90 houses, killing about 130 people; however, the death toll could have been as high as 300. This made it the deadliest single landslide on record on United States territory. Many of the homes in Mameyes were poorly built with tin and wood materials, and some were built on stilts.

== Aftermath ==
On October 7, Puerto Rico's governor Rafael Hernández Colón declared an islandwide state of emergency and activated 300 National Guardsmen to assist in search and rescue operations. Governor Colón sought "technical advice" from Mexico, as the country had experienced a devastating earthquake two weeks prior. The United States Coast Guard flew helicopters into flooded areas to rescue stranded residents, including 18 people along a hill in the western portion of the island. About $10 million in emergency funds was allocated by Puerto Rico's legislature, of which $1 million was distributed among the most affected families with $300 checks. The American Red Cross deployed a team of 15 people to Puerto Rico, who specialized in damage assessment, health services, or other services. After the storm, the Puerto Rico's government created a Rainfall-Runoff Alert Network, designed to predict flash flooding in advance, in conjunction with the National Weather Service, the United States Geological Survey, and the territory's Department of Natural Resources.

On October 10, United States president Ronald Reagan declared 33 municipalities across Puerto Rico as disaster area. This allocated federal funding for assistance to individual families and public aid to repair public facilities. Federal Emergency Management Agency ultimately provided $63 million in aid to the territory. Puerto Ricans living in the United States raised money and collected donations for the residents on the island.

External audio
- You may listen to Memorial Acts associated with the observance of the 30th Anniversary (Year 2015) of the tragedy HERE

Governor Colón considered turning the Mameyes neighborhood into a common grave to prevent the spread of disease outbreak. As a result, the National Guard evacuated the town, although the governor changed his mind after public outcry. Initially, a death toll of 500 people was reported, although that was "the product of the original, collective hysteria," according to the mayor of Ponce's press officer. Additionally, the number of destroyed houses was overestimated, only to be revised downward owing to before-and-after satellite images and interviews with survivors. After the Mameyes landslide, about 150 people, including National Guardsmen, worked to locate bodies with the assistance of six rescue dogs. Rescue workers also recovered 23 bodies from the collapsed bridge near Coamo. On October 13, officials halted the search for any survivors of the landslide, although workers continued to look for storm victims. On October 22, Governor Colón ordered the teams to stop searching for bodies after officials determined that there was a threat of further landslides. Workers initially had difficulty assisting the affected families due to the occurrence in early morning and the continued intensity of the rain, and as a result, only 50 bodies were recovered. Many houses around the Mameyes landslide were later demolished as they were at risk for further landslides.

Governor Hernández Colón announced that a memorial would be created for the Mameyes victims at the site. Originally the memorial was known as "el Parque de la Recordación del Barrio Mameyes", literally "Park of the Remembrance of the Neighborhood Mameyes" in English. In 2011, however, residents of Ponce successfully petitioned to change the name from a park to a memorial site.

Despite the high amount deaths in Puerto Rico floods, the name, "Isabel" was not retired, but was retired in the 2003 Atlantic hurricane season.

== Children's drawings ==
Three days before the Mameyes landslide, a group of children from a nearby Head Start school were asked by their teacher to draw "whatever came to their minds". Several of them made drawings that some people see as premonitions of the disaster. Several of the drawings featured crosses, and dark earth-like colors. Some of the children died in the landslide. The drawings were handed by an unidentified teacher to Gladys Torres, administrator of public documents and Director of the Historic Archive of Ponce. They are exhibited in the Ponce Museum of History.

== See also ==
- 2015 El Cambray Dos landslide
