= Laura Meneses =

Peruvian-Cuban biologist and political activist

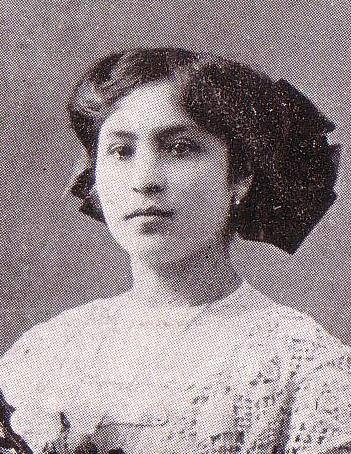
- Laura Meneses del Carpio. First woman in Lima who obtained a degree in San Marcos (Variedades Magazine, 1913).
- Born: Laura Meneses del Carpio; March 31, 1894; Arequipa, Peru
- Died: April 15, 1973 (aged 79); Havana, Cuba
- Burial place: Colón Cemetery
- Education: National University of San Marcos, Radcliffe College/Harvard University
- Occupations: Biologist, political activist
- Spouse: Pedro Albizu Campos
- Children: Pedro, Rosa, Laura
- Parents: Juan Rosa Meneses del Pino (father); Emilia del Carpio Tupayachi (mother)

Laura Meneses del Carpio (Arequipa, Peru, March 31, 1894 - Havana, Cuba, April 15, 1973) was the first Latin American in 1920 to be accepted into Radcliffe College, the women's educational institution affiliated with Harvard University. She earned a doctorate in natural sciences and became active in the movement for Puerto Rican independence from the United States.

== Biography ==
Laura Meneses del Carpio was born on March 31, 1894, in the city of Arequipa, Peru, the youngest daughter of Emilia del Carpio Tupayachi and Juan Rosa Meneses del Pino, who was a colonel in the Peruvian army.

=== Education ===
Meneses studied natural sciences at the Universidad Nacional Mayor de San Marcos in Lima, Peru, graduating with a bachelor's degree in biology in 1913. In 1918, she was awarded a doctorate in natural sciences at the same university. She spoke Spanish and English fluently as well as two indigenous languages from South America, Quechua and Aymara.

In 1920, on the recommendation of the family of a Peruvian composer residing in Boston, Meneses enrolled in the all-female Radcliffe College in Cambridge, Massachusetts (which today is a part of Harvard). While there she met her future husband, the budding attorney and Puerto Rican activist Pedro Albizu Campos. They married two years later. With her husband, she became an important activist in a popular movement seeking independence for Puerto Rico from control by the United States. By doing so, Menses and Albizu Campos both became targets of American officials.

In 1937, Albizu Campos and the other Puerto Rican Nationalist leaders were sentenced to the federal penitentiary in Atlanta; he was not released for almost eleven years. Because her husband spent decades in detention (he spent 25 years in U.S. prisons), the couple was able to spend only 13 years together out of their 43 years of marriage.

=== Mexican years ===
Her husband was jailed again in 1950 after the defeat of the Puerto Rican Nationalist Party Revolts. Later that same year, Meneses moved with her children to Havana, Cuba, on behalf of her husband to denounce American imperialism there and in Puerto Rico. However, because of harassment from the U.S.-backed military dictator President Fulgencio Batista in Cuba, she moved again, this time to Mexico City. There she came to know Fidel Castro, Ernesto ‘Che’ Guevara, and other members of the July 26 Movement, and she actively supported the Cuban revolutionaries by writing press releases and other literature supporting their cause.

For many years, Meneses sought permission from the United States to visit Puerto Rico to see her husband who was ailing there, but she was denied on technicalities. Thereafter, she was repeatedly denied visas to visit Puerto Rico as well as the U.S. mainland.

=== Cuban years ===
When the Cuban revolution succeeded in 1959, Meneses was granted Cuban citizenship and was appointed a special envoy from the Cuban mission to the United Nations, which allowed her to legally visit New York City. While there, she took advantage of the opportunity to pursue the liberation of political prisoners like her husband as well as the island of Puerto Rico itself.

Meneses attended the first Latin American Women's Congress in Santiago, Chile in 1959 and, according to the Chilean press, "she was the most applauded delegate." In 1960 she was allowed to attend the International Women's Federation and this invitation, in turn, gave her the opportunity to visit other international destinations, including Denmark, the United Kingdom, France, Spain, and China.

Because of diplomatic pressure from the Cuban government, she was finally allowed to travel to Puerto Rico in 1965 to visit her ailing husband. He died shortly thereafter in San Juan.

Meneses returned to Havana and died on April 15, 1973. Her remains were buried in the city's old Colón Cemetery.

== See also ==
- Pedro Albizu Campos
- Puerto Rican Nationalist Party revolts of the 1950s

== External sources ==
- Austin, Dolores Stockton Helffrich. Albizu Campos and the Development of a Nationalist Ideology, 1922–1932. N.p., University of Wisconsin-Madison, 1983.
- Lora Gamarra, Silvia, et al. Una vida de amor y sacrificio. Puerto Rico, Publicaciones Puertorriqueñas, 2009.
