= Cemex =

Mexican multinational building materials company

Coordinates: 25°39′04″N 100°21′05″W

CEMEX, S.A.B. de C.V.
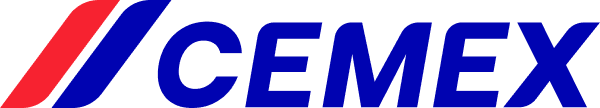
- Formerly: Cementos Portland Monterrey, S.A. (1920-1931); Cementos Mexicanos, S.A. (1931-1988); CEMEX, S.A. (1988-1994); CEMEX, S.A. de C.V. (1994-2006)
- Type: Sociedad Anónima Bursátil de Capital Variable
- Traded as: BMV: CEMEX; NYSE: CX; PSE: CHP
- Industry: Building materials
- Predecessor: Cementos Hidalgo
- Founded: 1920; 106 years ago
- Founder: Lorenzo Zambrano Gutierrez
- Headquarters: Monterrey, Nuevo León, Mexico
- Area served: Worldwide
- Key people: Rogelio Zambrano Lozano (Executive Chairman); Jaime Muguiro (CEO)
- Products: Cement, ready-mix concrete, and construction aggregates
- Revenue: ▼US$ 13 billion (2020)
- Net income: ▼ (US$ 1.47 billion) (2020)
- Total assets: ▼US$ 27.4 billion (2020)
- Number of employees: 41,000+
- Website: https://www.cemex.com/

CEMEX, S.A.B. de C.V., known as Cemex, is a Mexican multinational building materials company headquartered in San Pedro, near Monterrey, Nuevo León, Mexico. It manufactures and distributes cement, ready-mix concrete and aggregates in more than 50 countries. In 2020 it was ranked as the 5th largest cement company (by amount of cement produced annually) in the world, at 87.09 million tonnes.

Lorenzo Zambrano was the chairman and chief executive officer until his death on May 12, 2014. The Board of Directors named Rogelio Zambrano Lozano as chairman, and Fernando A. Gonzalez as CEO.

About a quarter of the company's sales come from its Mexico operations, a third from its plants in the U.S., 30% from its operations in Europe, North Africa, the Middle East and Asia, and the rest from its other plants around the world.

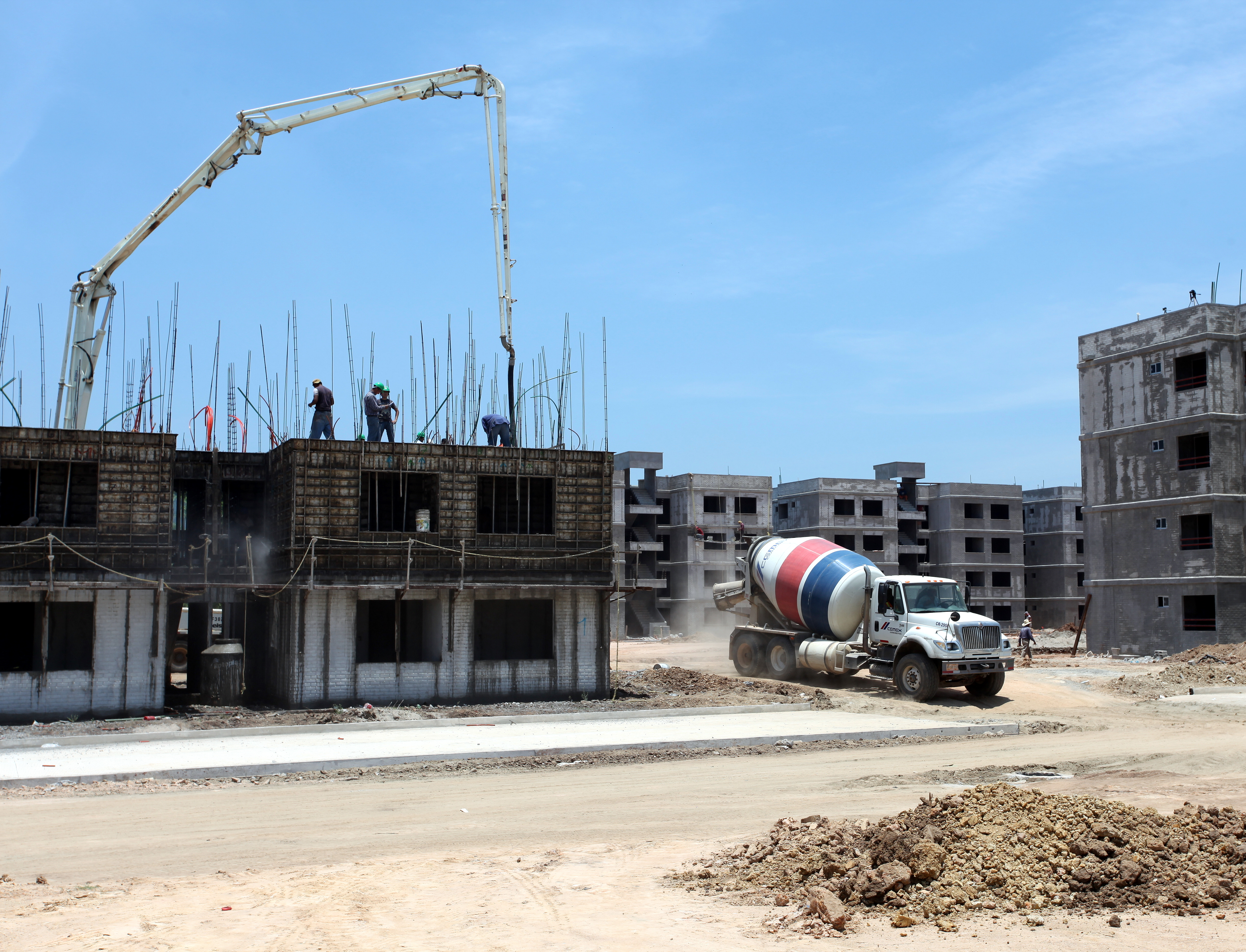
Cemex ready-mix truck departing jobsite after dispensing concrete for a multi-storey residential project in Villahermosa, Mexico

CEMEX currently operates on four continents, with 64 cement plants, 1,348 ready-mix-concrete facilities, 246 quarries, 269 distribution centers and 68 marine terminals.

In the 2021 Forbes Global 2000, Cemex was ranked as the 1178th -largest public company in the world with over US$13 billion in annual sales.

The company's world headquarters are in San Pedro Garza García, a city that is part of the Monterrey metropolitan area in the northeastern Mexican state of Nuevo León.

== History ==
CEMEX was founded with the opening of Cementos Hidalgo, in 1906. Meanwhile, Cementos Portland Monterrey began operations in 1920, and in 1931, the two companies merged, becoming Cementos Mexicanos, now CEMEX. In the 1960s, CEMEX grew significantly when it acquired several more plants throughout Mexico. In 1976, the company went public on the Mexican stock exchange, and that same year, became the largest cement producer in Mexico with the purchase of three plants from Cementos Guadalajara. In 1982, the company made significant progress in overseas markets, doubling its exports. Further acquisitions of Mexican cement companies were made in 1987 and 1989, making CEMEX one of the ten largest cement companies in the world.

In 2004, CEMEX received the Wharton Infosys Business Transformation Award for their creative and efficient use of information technology.

In 2005, CEMEX acquired RMC Group, a ready mixed concrete, quarrying and concrete products company headquartered in Egham, United Kingdom.

=== Internationalization, 1990–2006 ===
Former logo

In 1992, CEMEX began its push into the international landscape with the purchase of Spain's two largest cement companies, Valenciana de Cementos (Valcem, currently head of CEMEX Spain) and Cementos SANSON. Venezuela's largest cement company, VENCEMOS, was acquired by CEMEX in 1994, and plants were purchased the same year in the United States and in Panama. In 1995 CEMEX acquired a cement company in the Dominican Republic, and with the purchase of a majority stake in a Colombian cement company in 1996, CEMEX became the third largest cement company in the world. In 1997–1999, the company expanded its scope to include Asia and Africa, making major purchases in the Philippines, Indonesia and Egypt, as well as Costa Rica. The acquisition of U.S. based Southdown made CEMEX the largest cement company in North America, and further international purchases were made in the following two years—a Thai company in 2001, and in 2002, a Puerto Rican company.

On March 1, 2005, CEMEX completed its $5.8 billion acquisition of the London-based RMC Group, which made CEMEX the worldwide leader in ready-mix concrete production and increased its exposure to European markets. With the acquisition, the company expected its annual cement production to increase to 97 million tons. Also they had hoped to see its annual sales grow to $15 billion, just shy of the market leader, Lafarge NYSE: LR, which had sales of $17 billion. As none of these targets was met, CEMEX started looking for another suitor in its M&A push.

On October 27, 2006, CEMEX announced a US$12.8 billion offer to acquire all of the outstanding shares of Rinker Group, Limited. Seven months later, on April 10, 2007, the Rinker board of directors approved an upgraded offer of USD 14.2 billion, and on June 7, 2007, CEMEX secured the commitment from the holders of more than 50% of the shares to complete the acquisition.

=== Recent history (2006–) ===
Shortly after the apparent finalization of the Rinker deal in 2007, the United States Department of Justice brought an antitrust lawsuit against CEMEX, blocking the acquisition. After a lengthy process, CEMEX complied with regulators by divesting (selling) 40+ cement and concrete plants formerly part of itself or Rinker, essentially devaluing the initial deal.

In April 2008, the President of Venezuela, Hugo Chávez, announced the nationalization of "the whole cement industry" in that country, in response to the belief that the industry was exporting its products in order to receive prices above those it was allowed within the country. In mid-2008 the Venezuelan government took over the Venezuelan operations of CEMEX, the largest Venezuelan producer with around a 50% market share; a deal on compensation was still to be reached in March 2009, despite agreements being reached in mid-2008 with the other two major cement producers. In December 2011, an agreement was reached, with Cemex receiving $600m in compensation, and benefiting from the cancellation of $154m in debt.

After having problems with the Mexican peso devaluation of 2008, including problems with derivatives, CEMEX had to rethink its international standings to decrease debt and avoid a default. In June 2009, CEMEX sold its Australian operations to Holcim for A$ 2.2 billion (US$1.75 billion) helping refinance its US$14 billion debt, which partly was due to the acquisition, two years earlier, of the Rinker Group.

In December 2010, DOL Resolves Employee Back Wage Case With CEMEX – The U.S. Department of Labor announced the filing of a consent judgment in a case against CEMEX Inc. and the recovery of $1,514,449 in overtime back wages for 1,705 current and former ready-mix drivers who worked in eight states.

In 2016, Cemex sold its Rinker Materials pipe business to Quikrete.

In February 2018, the company reported record earnings of $750 million for all of 2016, the highest in a decade. Lowering company debt after recent acquisitions were a main cause of the company's financial performance. In the second-quarter 2021 CEMEX reported a net profit of US$270 million and a Debt-to-Ebitda 2.85 leverage ratio, within investment-grade range.

In July 2022, Cemex acquired majority stake in ProStein, a German aggregates producer.

In 2023, the U.S. National Labor Relations Board affirmed findings that Cemex had committed over two dozen unfair labor practices leading up to a 2019 union election. The board used this case to set a new policy that an employer who interferes with an election will be compelled to recognize the union without an election, where previously a new election would be ordered. The case marked a significant new policy which partly revived the Joy Silk doctrine.

== CEMEX worldwide ==
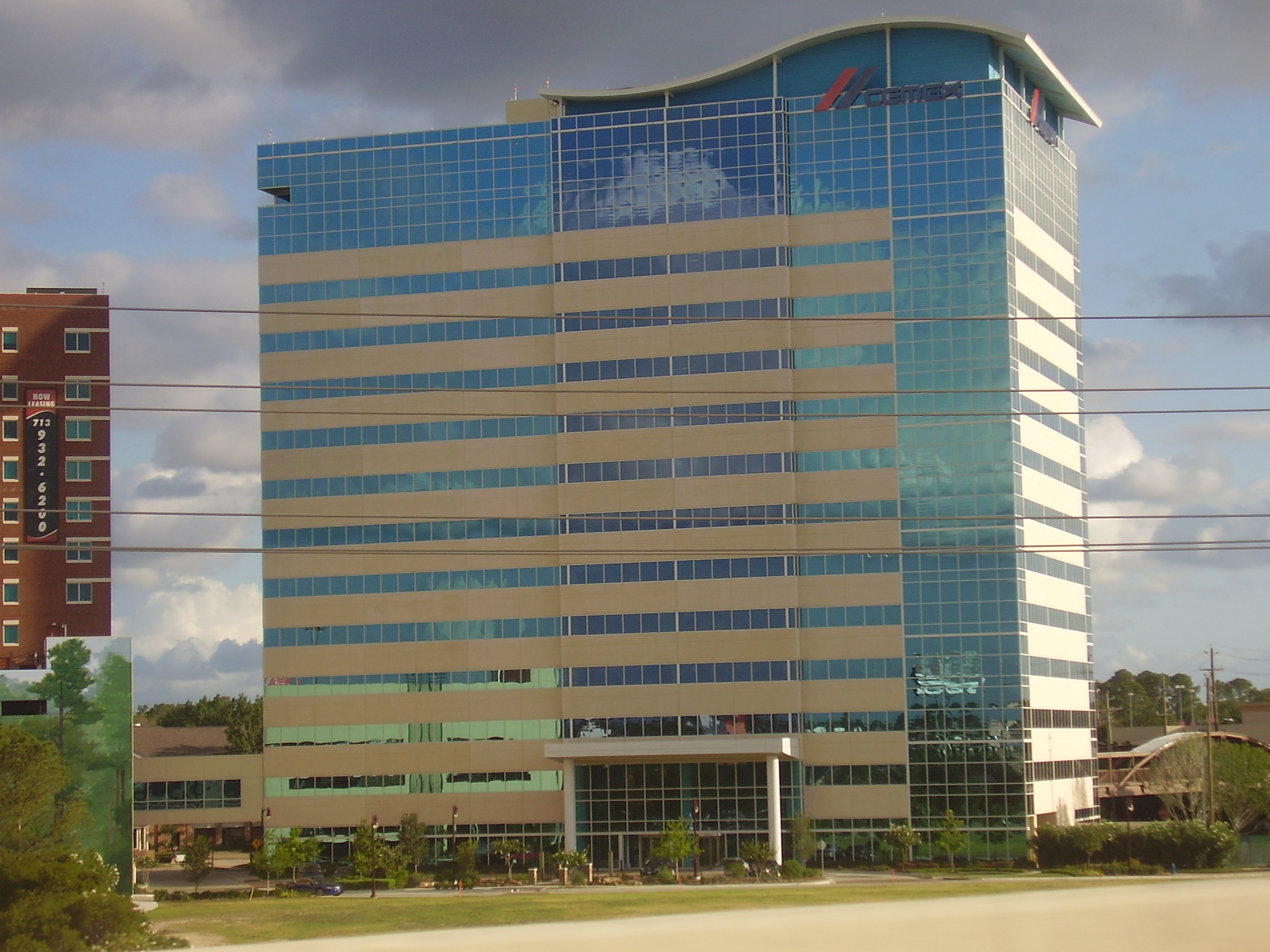
Cemex United States offices in Memorial City, Houston

CEMEX World Corporate Headquarters is in Monterrey, Mexico and its U.S. operations headquarters is in Memorial City, Houston, Texas.

The company operates in over 30 countries/territories around the world including:

- Argentina
- Bahamas
- Brazil
- Colombia
- Costa Rica
- Croatia
- Czech Republic
- Dominican Republic
- Egypt
- El Salvador
- France
- Germany
- Haiti
- Hungary
- Ireland
- Israel
- Jamaica
- Mexico
- Nicaragua
- Nigeria
- Norway
- Panama
- Peru
- Philippines
- Poland
- Puerto Rico
- Spain
- Sweden
- Switzerland
- Trinidad and Tobago
- United Arab Emirates
- United Kingdom
- United States

== Subsidiaries ==
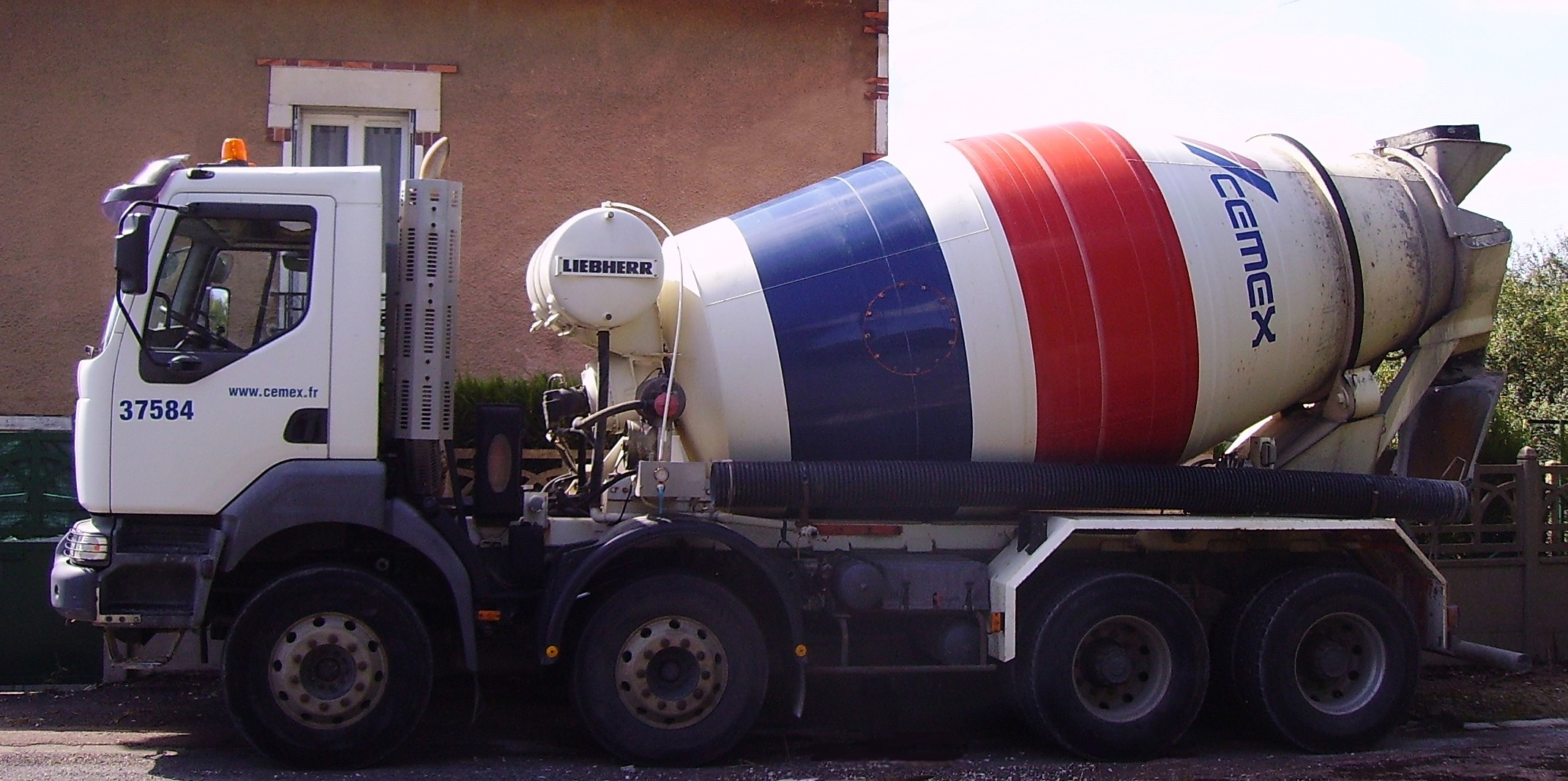
Cement mixer.

- Cemento Ponce General (See Ponce Cement, Inc.) – Ponce, Puerto Rico
- Puerto Rican Cement Company – Guaynabo, Puerto Rico
- Compania Valencia de Cementos Portland S.A. – Madrid, Spain
- CEMEX Asia Holdings Ltd. – Philippines
- CxNetworks – Miami, Florida, United States
- CEMEX USA – Houston, Texas, United States
  - Western Rail Road – New Braunfels, Texas, United States
  - Mojave Northern Railroad
- CEMEX UK Limited – Rugby, Warwickshire, United Kingdom
- New Sunward Holding – Amsterdam, Netherlands
- CEMEX Mexico – Monterrey, Nuevo Leon, Mexico
- Ready Mix USA – Birmingham, Alabama
- Caribbean Cement Company Limited – Kingston, Jamaica
- Trinidad Cement Limited – Trinidad
- Island Cement Company Limited – Nassau, The Bahamas
- Bahamas Concrete Holdings – Nassau, The Bahamas
- Sinergia Deportiva S.A. de C.V. (Joint venture with the Universidad Autónoma de Nuevo León)-Management and Commercial Operations of Tigres UANL professional association football club.

== Social responsibility ==
CEMEX has developed a number of educational and social responsibility initiatives. For example, it instituted the Premio CEMEX, an annual award that recognizes works in the fields of sustainability, accessibility, construction and architecture. Also, it funds the Catedra Blanca, and honors architecture courses in three universities: the ITESM, in Monterrey, the Universidad Iberoamericana, in Mexico City, and the Barcelona School of Architecture. Also, CEMEX has created the Centro CEMEX-Tecnológico de Monterrey, which is a research and development program for sustainable communities across Mexico thru the Premio CEMEX-TEC.

In 2007, the Organization of American States (OAS), through their Trust for the Americas, awarded the company The Corporate Citizen of the Americas Award 2007, for the social benefits of their program "Patrimonio Hoy", in Mexico, that according to José Miguel Insulza, President of the OAS, has a positive effect in low-income families. This initiative, conceived in 1998, aims to reduce the Mexican housing deficit, which leaves more than 20 million people with inadequate shelter. Patrimonio Hoy organizes low-income families into self-financing cells that facilitate and expedite the typical homebuilding process. CEMEX and its network provide the products needed but also the technical assistance, including an architect who helps design homes to optimize space and reduce waste. To date, more than 150,000 Mexican families have realized their dreams of home ownership

As of 2020, CEMEX Social Responsibility initiatives had benefited over 23 million people in its neighboring communities world-wide. The company also restated its Social Impact policy, with the goal of benefiting 30 million people by 2030. Fortune Magazine ranked CEMEX in 39th place in its 2020 Change the World Index.

== Environmental record ==
CEMEX has been accused of violating environmental laws in the United States. Environmental watchdog groups and the United States Environmental Protection Agency are threatening to file suit claiming the company has committed numerous violations of the Clean Air Act in Lyons, Colorado. CEMEX divested its operation in Lyons, Colorado, in 2016. The United States Environmental Protection Agency has also filed suit against CEMEX in Victorville, California, claiming the company failed to install modern air pollution controls, despite spending millions in renovations. The case was settled in 2009. In February 2021 the U.S. Department of Energy awarded funding for research on carbon-capture at the CEMEX Victorville cement plant.

In the United Kingdom, CEMEX was originally fined £400,000 in October 2006 after hazardous dust was deposited up to three miles (5 km) away from its Rugby works. The fine was the highest ever given under the Integrated Pollution Prevention and Control regulations, and was also the highest for an Environment Agency prosecution for six years. The fine was, however, judged excessive by the Court of Appeal and so reduced to £50,000. In April 2007, CEMEX announced that it had installed a £6.5 million dust abatement system at the same works in Rugby, which had cut particulate emissions by 80%. The site comes under the auspices of the EU Waste Incineration Directive as it burns waste tires for fuel. There are concerns over the impact on both the environment and human health from this practice, although it is common practice in many cement works. In 2021 CEMEX announced investments in Europe to promote an environmentally-friendly “circular economy,” safely using waste as a substitute for fossil fuels, including in its Rugby plant.

During tests conducted from June 10 to August 5, 2008, the Monterey Bay (California) Unified Air Pollution Control District reported high levels of chromium VI, also known as hexavalent chromium, a cancer causing chemical agent, at an elementary school and fire department in Davenport, California. Chromium VI is the contaminant that inspired the movie, Erin Brockovich. The toxic substance apparently originated from dust emitted by the Cemex Cement plant in Davenport, as the levels of Chromium VI measured eight times the air district's acceptable level at Pacific Elementary School and 10 times at the Davenport Fire Department. Both are located less than a half-mile from CEMEX. Chromium VI may have been unwittingly produced at the CEMEX plant in Davenport for the last seven years. According to Ed Kendig, the executive director of the Monterey Bay Unified Air Pollution Control District, it's "highly possible" that Chromium VI continues to be produced across the country as an accidental, previously unknown byproduct of the cement-making process.

In 2007, the EPA filed a complaint against CEMEX for violating federal air regulations at its Victorville plant, and in 2006, CEMEX was cited for violations at plants in Santa Barbara and Michigan.

Cemex had a sand mining operation in the city of Marina, California, along the Monterey Bay coastline that concerned environmentalists and scientists. The California Coastal Commission in March 2016 issued a cease and desist order asking for "administration civil penalties", stating that "the operation is narrowing beaches and impacting environmentally sensitive habitat." Cemex denied the allegations and continued to operate. A settlement was reached in 2017 and CEMEX ended mining in December 2020.

In 2020 CEMEX announced a new climate action strategy, aiming to lower its overall carbon footprint by 35% in 2030 compared to a 1990 baseline, and to deliver net zero concrete by 2050. In May 2021 CEMEX partnered with British oil company BP to research industry-wide decarbonization of cement production.

In 2024, Oishi (Philippine brand) and CEMEX Asia Holdings Ltd. (Philippines) partnered to support sustainable disposal of plastic waste per commitment to environmental stewardship and circular economy principles in industrial operations. “Our partnership with Liwayway allows us to support them with the EPR law (Extended Producer Responsibility Act EPRA of 2022 Republic Act No. 11898), while it also contributes to our Future in Action agenda of becoming a net zero carbon emission company,” said Luis Franco, Cemex CEO. Liwayway will channel plastic packaging waste to Cemex's Solid Cement plant for co-processing.

== Competitors ==
Main CEMEX competitors / global cement players are:

- Holcim
- HeidelbergCement
- Votorantim Cimentos
- Unibeton Ready Mix

== See also ==
- List of companies traded on the Bolsa Mexicana de Valores
- List of Mexican companies
- Economy of Mexico
