= Machuelo Abajo =

Barrio of Ponce, Puerto Rico

- Barrio
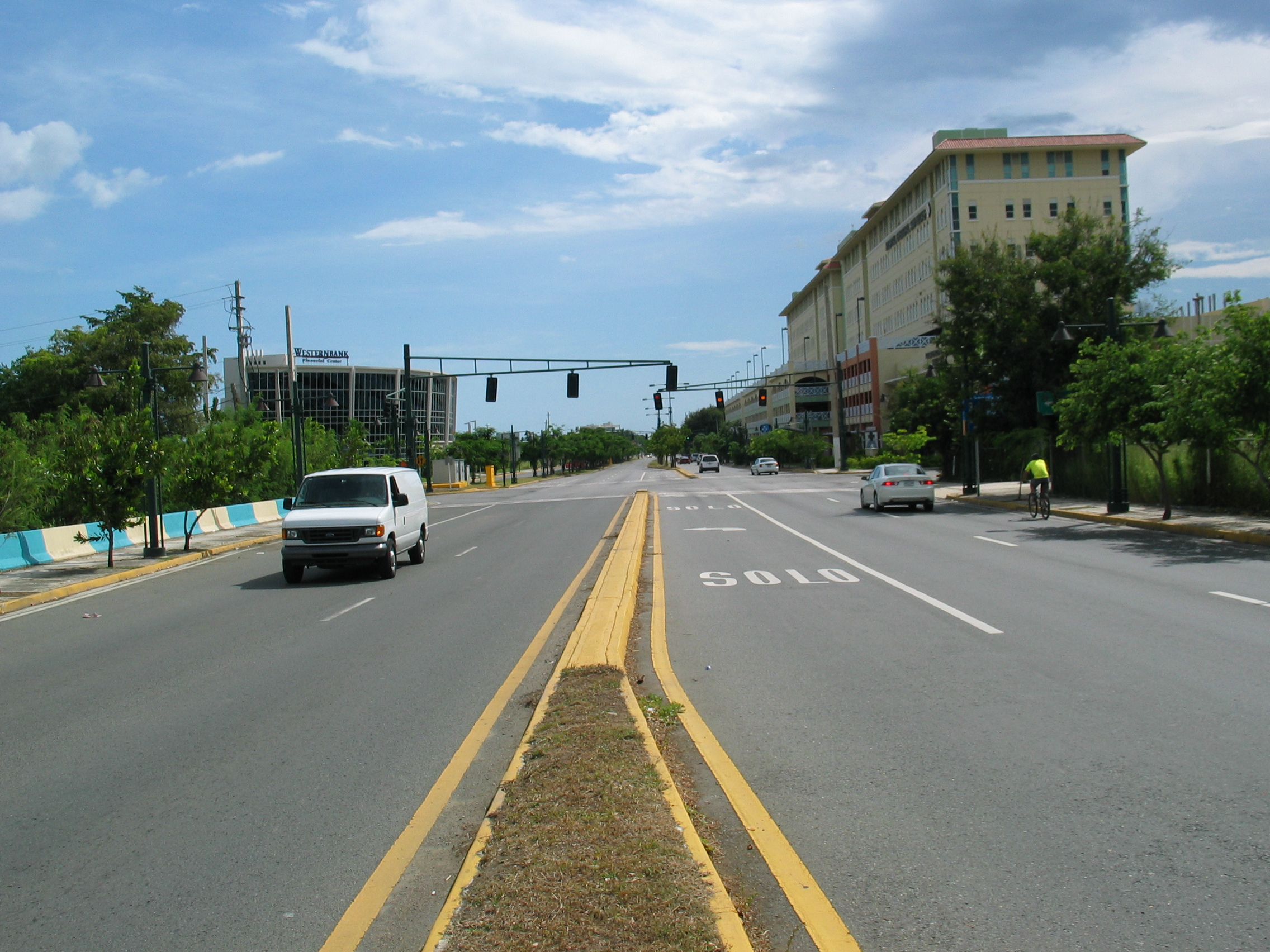
- Street scene in southern Barrio Machuelo Abajo, in the city of Ponce

- Location of barrio Machuelo Abajo within the municipality of Ponce shown in red

- Location of Puerto Rico
- Coordinates: 18°01′30″N 66°35′46″W
- Commonwealth: Puerto Rico
- Municipality: Ponce

Area
  - Total: 1.86 sq mi (4.8 km^{2})
  - Land: 1.79 sq mi (4.6 km^{2})
  - Water: 0.07 sq mi (0.18 km^{2})
- Elevation: 85 ft (26 m)

Population (2010)
  - Total: 11,855
  - Density: 6,622.9/sq mi (2,557.1/km^{2})
- Source: 2010 Census
- Time zone: UTC−4 (AST)

Machuelo Abajo (Spanish pronunciation: [maˈtʃwelo aˈβaxo]) is one of the 31 barrios of the municipality of Ponce, Puerto Rico. Along with Canas Urbano, Magueyes Urbano, Portugués Urbano, and San Antón, Machuelo Abajo is one of the municipality's five originally rural barrios that are now also part of the urban zone of the city of Ponce. It was founded in 1818.

== Location ==
Machuelo Abajo is an urban barrio located in the southern section of the municipality, in the northeast portion of the city of Ponce, within the Ponce city limits, at latitude 18.024217 N, and longitude -66.600217 W.

== Boundaries ==
Machuelo Abajo is bounded on the North by Tito Castro Avenue/PR-14 (roughly), on the South by Miguel Pou Boulevard (roughly), and Abaisin Street, on the West by Rio Portugues, and on the East by Los Negrones Hill, Rio Bucana, and Emilio Fagot Street (roughly).

In terms of barrio-to-barrio boundaries, Machuelo Abajo is bounded in the North by Machuelo Arriba, in the South by San Anton and Sabanetas, in the West by Quinto and Sexto, and in the East by Sabanetas.

== Features and demographics ==
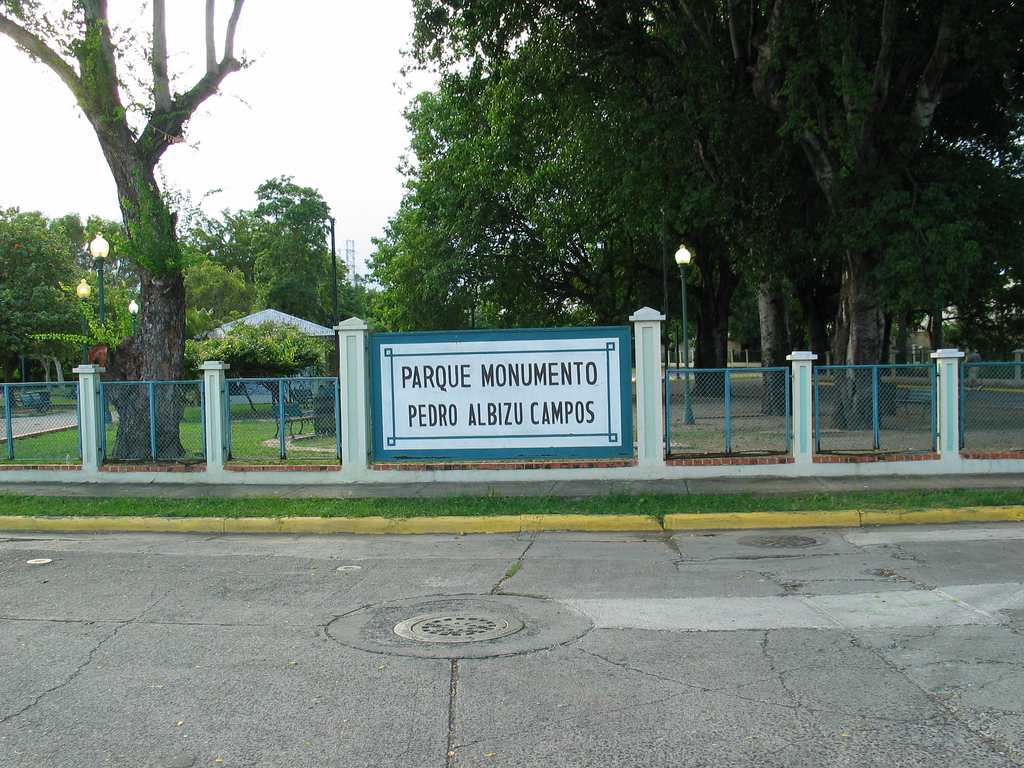
Pedro Albizu Campos Park in Barrio Machuelo Abajo

Machuelo Abajo is home to the communities of Jardines Fagot, La Rambla, La Alhambra, Extension La Alhambra, Flamboyanes, Bella Vista, Santa Clara, and Riberas del Bucana. In addition the communities of Residencial Dr. Pila, Villa Esperanza, and Valle Verde, make their home there as well.

Machuelo Abajo has 1.77 square miles (4.6 km^{2}) of land area and 0.09 square miles (230,000 m^{2}) of water area. In 2000, the population of Machuelo Abajo was 13,302 persons, and it had a density of 7,522 persons per square mile.

In 2010, the population of Machuelo Abajo was 11,855 persons, and it had a density of 6,622.9 persons per square mile.

The highest point in Barrio Machuelo Abajo is Cerro Los Negrones at 397 feet, located northwest of Mercedita Airport.

Historical population
| Census | Pop. | Note | %± |
|---|---|---|---|
| 1900 | 1,893 | | — |
| 1910 | 1,840 | | −2.8% |
| 1920 | 2,091 | | 13.6% |
| 1930 | 3,183 | | 52.2% |
| 1940 | 5,394 | | 69.5% |
| 1950 | 6,545 | | 21.3% |
| 1960 | 9,961 | | 52.2% |
| 1970 | 10,487 | | 5.3% |
| 1980 | 15,593 | | 48.7% |
| 1990 | 16,265 | | 4.3% |
| 2000 | 13,302 | | −18.2% |
| 2010 | 11,855 | | −10.9% |
U.S. Decennial Census; 1899 (shown as 1900) 1910-1930; 1930-1950 1960 1980-2000 2010

== Notable Landmarks ==
Río Bucaná runs a stretch of its course (channelized) through barrio Machuelo Abajo. The new Hospital San Lucas is located in Machuelo Abajo where the old Ponce District Hospital was located on Puerto Rico Highway 14.

== Notable people from Machuelo Abajo ==
- Pedro Albizu Campos
- Marta Romero
- Héctor Lavoe

== See also ==
- List of communities in Puerto Rico
