= Ricardo Jiménez (FALN) =

Puerto Rican nationalist

- Born: April 3, 1956 (age 70); San Sebastián, Puerto Rico
- Penalty: Sedition

Ricardo Jiménez was a Puerto Rican member of the Fuerzas Armadas de Liberación Nacional Puertorriqueña who was sentenced to 90 years in prison for seditious conspiracy and other charges. He was sentenced on February 18, 1981, and incarcerated in a U.S. federal prison. However, he was released early from prison, after President Bill Clinton extended a clemency offer to him on September 7, 1999.

== Early years and personal life ==
Jiménez was born in Puerto Rico in 1956. His family moved to the U.S. when he was still an infant. He attended Tuley High School in Chicago when the school was in the midst of a crisis brought about by the lack of a relevant curriculum for Puerto Rican students. As a member of Aspira and the student council he was a leader in struggles which ultimately led to the creation of the Roberto Clemente High School. Jiménez was also Vice President of the Senior Class, a member of the national Honor Society and in 1974 was chosen by the mayor as the city of Chicago's Senior High School Student of the Year.

In his community Jiménez worked as a volunteer at El Rancor, a drug rehabilitation center, and on a project on housing which led to the exposure of a plan called the Chicago 21 plan, to turn the Puerto Rican community into an enclave for the high income professional class. Upon graduation he attended Loyola University and was a member of the Latin American Student Organization, which developed the university's first Puerto Rican history class. He later attended Illinois Institute of Technology in Chicago and was selected to represent the student body in a national conference on the need to force large U.S. corporations to open their doors to Latino engineers and other high tech professionals.

== Seditious conspiracy ==
Jiménez and 11 others were arrested on April 4, 1980, in Evanston, Illinois. They had been linked to more than 100 bombings or attempted bombings since 1974 in their attempt to achieve independence for Puerto Rico. At their trial proceedings, some of the arrested declared their status as prisoners of war, and refused to participate in the proceedings.

None of the bombings of which they were convicted resulted in deaths or injuries. Jimenez was given a 90-year federal sentence for seditious conspiracy and other charges. Among the other convicted Puerto Rican nationalists there were sentences of as long as 90 years in Federal prisons for offenses including sedition, possession of unregistered firearms, interstate transportation of a stolen vehicle, interference with interstate commerce by violence and interstate transportation of firearms with intent to commit a crime. None of those granted clemency were convicted in any of the actual bombings. Rather, they had been convicted on a variety of charges ranging from bomb making and conspiracy to armed robbery and firearms violations. They were all convicted for sedition, the act of attempting to overthrow the Government of the United States in Puerto Rico by force.

In prison, Jimenez gravitated to educational programs, both as a student and as a tutor for other students. He volunteered teaching illiterate and functionally illiterate prisoners to read and write.

== Human rights violations ==
There were reports of human rights violations against the FALN prisoners. The prisoners were placed in prisons far from their families, some were sexually assaulted by prison personnel, some were denied adequate medical attention, and others were kept in isolated underground prison cells for no reason. Amnesty International and the House of Representatives' Subcommittee on Courts, Intellectual Property and the Administration of Justice both criticized the conditions. The conditions were found to be in violation of the U.N. Standard Minimum Rules for the Treatment of Prisoners. A federal judge also expressed concerns regarding FALN prisoners held at the Female High Security Unit, Lexington, Kentucky. In the case of Baraldini vs. Meese, the judge found that their exceptionally restrictive conditions of detention were not in response to any legitimate security threat, and were therefore "an exaggerated response" and in violation of the prisoners' First Amendment rights.

== Political prisoner ==
At the time of their arrest Jimenez and the others declared themselves to be combatants in an anti-colonial war against the United States to liberate Puerto Rico from U.S. domination and invoked prisoner of war status. They argued that the U.S. courts did not have jurisdiction to try them as criminals and petitioned for their cases to be handed over to an international court that would determine their status. The U.S. Government, however, did not recognize their request.

The sentences received by Jimenez and the other Nationalists were judged to be "out of proportion to the nationalists' offenses." Statistics showed their sentences were almost 20 times greater than sentences for similar offenses by the American population at large.

For many years, numerous national and international organizations criticized Jimenez's incarceration categorizing it as political imprisonment. Jiménez was finally released from prison on September 10, 1999, after President Bill Clinton extended him clemency. Clinton cited Rev. Desmond Tutu and former President Jimmy Carter as having been influential on his decision to grant Jimenez the clemency offer. Cases involving the release of other Puerto Rican Nationalist prisoners have also been categorized as cases of political prisoners, with some being more vocal than others.

In criticizing President Clinton's decision to release the Puerto Rican prisoners, the conservative U.S. Senate Republican Policy Committee also categorized Jimenez as a "Puerto Rican Nationalist", echoing a recent Newsweek article. In 2006, the United Nations called for the release of the remaining Puerto Rican political prisoners in United States prisons.

== HIV/AIDS activism ==
As of 2011, Jiménez lives in Chicago and works as an HIV/AIDS counselor for the Latino HIV/AIDS support agency, Vida/SIDA, a project of the Puerto Rican Cultural Center. He is also active in the movement for funding of HIV intervention/prevention for the Latino community and for LGBTQ (lesbian/gay/bisexual/transgender/queer) rights. Jiménez is currently an openly gay man, as he has discussed in a radio interview.

== See also ==
- Oscar López Rivera
- Carlos Alberto Torres
- Juan Enrique Segarra-Palmer
- Edwin Cortes
- Pedro Albizu Campos
- Oscar Collazo
- Lolita Lebrón
- Puerto Rican independence movement
