= Adolfo Matos =

Puerto Rican activist (born 1950)

Adolfo Matos (born September 18, 1950) is a Puerto Rican member of the FALN (a group which fought for Puerto Rican independence during the 1970s) who received a sentence of 70 years for seditious conspiracy and other charges. He was sentenced on February 18, 1981, and incarcerated in a U.S. federal prison. However, he was released early from prison, after President Bill Clinton extended a clemency offer to him on September 7, 1999.

== Early years and personal life ==
Matos was born in Lajas, Puerto Rico on September 18, 1950. He moved to New York City at a very young age where he later married Helen Rosado, and with whom he fathered two daughters, Rosa Maria and Lydia. Matos is a skilled artist, working with copper etchings that depict Puerto Rican historical and cultural figures. His work has been displayed at the Juan Antonio Corretjer Puerto Rican Cultural Center in Chicago and elsewhere.

== Seditious conspiracy ==
Matos and 11 others were arrested on April 4, 1980, in Evanston, Illinois. They had been linked to more than 100 bombings or attempted bombings since 1974 in their attempt to achieve independence for Puerto Rico. At their trial proceedings, all of the arrested declared their status as prisoners of war, and refused to participate in the proceedings.

None of the bombings of which they were convicted resulted in deaths or injuries. Matos was given a 70-year federal sentence for seditious conspiracy and other charges. Among the other convicted Puerto Rican nationalists there were sentences of as long as 90 years in Federal prisons for offenses including sedition, possession of unregistered firearms, interstate transportation of a stolen vehicle, interference with interstate commerce by violence and interstate transportation of firearms with intent to commit a crime. None of those granted clemency were convicted in any of the actual bombings. Rather, they had been convicted on a variety of charges ranging from bomb making and conspiracy to armed robbery and firearms violations. They were all convicted for sedition, the act of attempting to overthrow the Government of the United States in Puerto Rico by force.

== Human rights violations ==
There were reports of human rights violations against the FALN prisoners. The prisoners were placed in prisons far from their families, some were sexually assaulted by prison personnel, some were denied adequate medical attention, and others were kept in isolated underground prison cells for no reason. Amnesty International and the House of Representatives' Subcommittee on Courts, Intellectual Property and the Administration of Justice both criticized the conditions. The conditions were found to be in violation of the U.N. Standard Minimum Rules for the Treatment of Prisoners. A federal judge also expressed concerns regarding FALN prisoners held at the Female High Security Unit, Lexington, Kentucky. In the case of Baraldini vs. Meese, the judge found that their exceptionally restrictive conditions of detention were not in response to any legitimate security threat, and were therefore "an exaggerated response" and in violation of the prisoners' First Amendment rights.

After his capture in 1980, Matos was held for almost 4 years in several Illinois state prisons. He was transferred 10 times to nine different state prisons. He was almost always held in solitary confinement, was not allowed personal property, nor use of the telephone. He was locked down twenty-three hours a day. All of his activities were documented every half-hour by prison guards who kept a log. Following these transfers Adolfo was then incarcerated in a federal prison camp in Lompoc, California, despite having been captured in Illinois, and having the rest of his family in New York City and none in California.

== Political prisoner ==
At the time of their arrest Matos and the others declared themselves to be combatants in an anti-colonial war against the United States to liberate Puerto Rico from U.S. domination and invoked prisoner of war status. They argued that the U.S. courts did not have jurisdiction to try them as criminals and petitioned for their cases to be handed over to an international court that would determine their status. The U.S. Government, however, did not recognize their request.

The sentences received by Matos and the other Nationalists were judged to be "out of proportion to the nationalists' offenses." Statistics showed their sentences were almost 20 times greater than sentences for similar offenses by the American population at large.

For many years, numerous national and international organizations criticized Matos' incarceration categorizing it as political imprisonment. Adolfo Matos was finally released from prison on September 10, 1999, after President Bill Clinton extended him clemency. Clinton cited Rev. Desmond Tutu and former President Jimmy Carter as having been influential on his decision to grant Matos the clemency offer. Cases involving the release of other Puerto Rican Nationalist prisoners have also been categorized as cases of political prisoners, with some being more vocal than others.

In criticizing President Clinton's decision to release the Puerto Rican prisoners, the conservative U.S. Senate Republican Policy Committee also categorized Matos as a "Puerto Rican Nationalist", echoing a recent Newsweek article. In 2006, the United Nations called for the release of the remaining Puerto Rican political prisoners in United States prisons.

== See also ==
- Oscar López Rivera
- Carlos Alberto Torres
- Juan Enrique Segarra-Palmer
- Edwin Cortes
- Pedro Albizu Campos
- Oscar Collazo
- Lolita Lebrón
- Puerto Rican independence movement
