= Luis Rosa =

Puerto Rican activist (born 1960)

Luis Rosa is a Puerto Rican nationalist and member of the FALN who received a sentence of 75 years for seditious conspiracy and related charges. He was sentenced on 18 February 1981 and subsequently incarcerated in a U.S. federal prison. He was released early from prison after President Bill Clinton extended a clemency offer to him on 7 September 1999.

== Early years and personal life ==
Luis was born in Chicago in 1960. At the time of his arrest he was 19 years old and was a young father and university student. He was also an excellent baseball player, recruited by professional teams. At the University of Illinois he became involved in the student movement and was president of the Union for Puerto Rican Students. In the community he was particularly involved in the struggle against police brutality. Luis was involved in the campaign against police murders of unarmed Puerto Ricans which arose in response to the killings of Cruz and Osorio in Humboldt Park in 1977 by the Chicago police. He was an organizer for the Desfile del Pueblo Puertorriqueno and at the Puerto Rican Cultural Center.

== Seditious conspiracy ==
Rosa and 11 other nationalists were arrested on 4 April 1980, in Evanston, Illinois. They had been linked to more than 100 bombings or attempted bombings since 1974 in their attempt to achieve independence for Puerto Rico. At their trial proceedings, all of the arrested declared their status as prisoners of war, and refused to participate in the proceedings.

None of the bombings of which they were convicted resulted in deaths or injuries. Rosa was given a 75-year federal sentence for seditious conspiracy and other charges. Among the other convicted Puerto Rican nationalists there were sentences of as long as 90 years in Federal prisons for offenses including sedition, possession of unregistered firearms, interstate transportation of a stolen vehicle, interference with interstate commerce by violence and interstate transportation of firearms with intent to commit a crime. None of those granted clemency were convicted in any of the actual bombings. Rather, they had been convicted on a variety of charges ranging from bomb-making and conspiracy to armed robbery and firearms violations. They were all convicted for sedition, the act of attempting to overthrow the Government of the United States in Puerto Rico by force.

In prison Luis continued to be involved in sports, and educational and cultural activities. "His spotless record did not prevent the state system from shuttling him mercilessly between maximum security prisons, or from one cell to another within a prison, or from limiting his access to educational and other programs available to other prisoners."

== Human rights violations ==
There were reports of human rights violations against the FALN prisoners. The prisoners were placed in prisons far from their families, some were sexually assaulted by prison personnel, some were denied adequate medical attention, and others were kept in isolated underground prison cells for no reason. Amnesty International and the House of Representatives' Subcommittee on Courts, Intellectual Property and the Administration of Justice both criticized the conditions. The conditions were found to be in violation of the U.N. Standard Minimum Rules for the Treatment of Prisoners. A federal judge also expressed concerns regarding FALN prisoners held at the Female High Security Unit, Lexington, Kentucky. In the case of Baraldini vs. Meese, the judge found that their exceptionally restrictive conditions of detention were not in response to any legitimate security threat, and were therefore "an exaggerated response" and in violation of the prisoners' First Amendment rights.

== Political prisoner ==
At the time of their arrest Rosa and the others declared themselves to be combatants in an anti-colonial war against the United States to liberate Puerto Rico from U.S. domination and invoked prisoner of war status. They argued that the U.S. courts did not have jurisdiction to try them as criminals and petitioned for their cases to be handed over to an international court that would determine their status. The U.S. Government, however, did not recognize their request.

The sentences received by Rosa and the other nationalist were judged to be "out of proportion to the nationalists' offenses." According to Outstanding Book Award editors Andrés Torres and José Emiliano Velázquez, U.S. Government statistics showed the prisoners' sentences were "about six times longer" than sentences for murder offenses by the American population at large.

For many years numerous national and international organizations criticized Rosa's incarceration categorizing it as political imprisonment. Luis Rosa was released from prison on 10 September 1999 after President Bill Clinton extended him clemency. Clinton cited Rev. Desmond Tutu and former President Jimmy Carter as having been influential on his decision to grant Rosa the clemency offer. Cases involving the release of other Puerto Rican Nationalist prisoners have also been categorized as cases of political prisoners, with some being more vocal than others.

In criticizing President Clinton's decision to release the Puerto Rican prisoners, the conservative U.S. Senate Republican Policy Committee also categorized Rosa as a "Puerto Rican Nationalist", echoing a recent Newsweek article. In 2006, the United Nations called for the release of the remaining Puerto Rican political prisoners in United States prisons.

== See also ==
- Oscar López Rivera
- Carlos Alberto Torres
- Juan Enrique Segarra-Palmer
- Edwin Cortes
- Pedro Albizu Campos
- Oscar Collazo
- Lolita Lebrón
- Puerto Rican independence movement
