= Dylcia Noemi Pagan =

Puerto Rican activist (1946–2024)

Dylcia Noemí Pagán (October 15, 1946 – June 30, 2024) was a Puerto Rican member of the FALN who received a sentence of 55 years for seditious conspiracy and other charges. She was sentenced on February 18, 1981, and incarcerated in a U.S. federal prison. However, she was released early from prison, after President Bill Clinton extended a clemency offer to her on September 7, 1999.

== Early years and personal life ==
Dylcia Noemi Pagan was born in New York City in 1946. At an early age she became involved in the civil rights movement, participating in voter registration drives and ran as a Democratic candidate in Shirley Chrisholm's campaign. As a student at Brooklyn College she helped organize the Puerto Rican Student Union which resulted in the formulation of a student-controlled Puerto Rican Studies Department. By the early 1970s, she began a career as a TV producer and writer developing investigative documentaries and children's programs at NBC, ABC, CBS, and PBS. She worked with the Puerto Rican Media and Education Council, which filed a series of lawsuits against the major television stations which facilitated the local public affairs programming that still exists today. She also worked as the English editor of the bilingual daily, El Tiempo.

== Political activism ==
=== Seditious conspiracy ===
Pagan was arrested in 1980 and charged with seditious conspiracy and related charges and sentenced to 63 years. When she was arrested, her young child, whose safety she feared for, was hidden from the government. In the prison she developed educational and cultural programs for the other inmates, taught aerobics, directed theatrical performances, and organized carnivals for Children's Day.

Pagan and 11 others were arrested on April 4, 1980, in Evanston, Illinois. They had been linked to more than 100 bombings or attempted bombings since 1974 in their attempt to achieve independence for Puerto Rico. At their trial proceedings, some of the arrested declared their status as prisoners of war, and refused to participate in the proceedings.

None of the bombings of which they were convicted resulted in deaths or injuries. Pagan was given a 55-year federal sentence for seditious conspiracy and other charges. Among the other convicted Puerto Rican nationalists there were sentences of as long as 90 years in Federal prisons for offenses including sedition, possession of unregistered firearms, interstate transportation of a stolen vehicle, interference with interstate commerce by violence and interstate transportation of firearms with intent to commit a crime. None of those granted clemency were convicted in any of the actual bombings. Rather, they had been convicted on a variety of charges ranging from bomb making and conspiracy to armed robbery and firearms violations. They were all convicted for sedition, the act of attempting to overthrow the Government of the United States in Puerto Rico by force.

=== Human rights violations ===
There were reports of human rights violations against the FALN prisoners. The prisoners were placed in prisons far from their families, some were sexually assaulted by prison personnel, some were denied adequate medical attention, and others were kept in isolated underground prison cells for no reason. Amnesty International and the House of Representatives' Subcommittee on Courts, Intellectual Property and the Administration of Justice both criticized the conditions. The conditions were found to be in violation of the U.N. Standard Minimum Rules for the Treatment of Prisoners. A federal judge also expressed concerns regarding FALN prisoners held at the Female High Security Unit, Lexington, Kentucky. In the case of Baraldini vs. Meese, the judge found that their exceptionally restrictive conditions of detention were not in response to any legitimate security threat, and were therefore "an exaggerated response" and in violation of the prisoners' First Amendment rights.

=== Political prisoner ===
At the time of their arrest Pagan and the others declared themselves to be combatants in an anti-colonial war against the United States to liberate Puerto Rico from U.S. domination and invoked prisoner of war status. They argued that the U.S. courts did not have jurisdiction to try them as criminals and petitioned for their cases to be handed over to an international court that would determine their status. The U.S. Government, however, did not recognize their request.

The sentences received by Pagan and the other Nationalists were judged to be "out of proportion to the nationalists' offenses." Statistics showed their sentences were almost 20 times greater than sentences for similar offenses by the American population at large.

For many years, numerous national and international organizations criticized Pagan's incarceration categorizing it as political imprisonment. Dylcia Noemi was finally released from prison on September 10, 1999, after President Bill Clinton extended her clemency. Clinton cited Rev. Desmond Tutu and former President Jimmy Carter as having been influential on his decision to grant Pagan the clemency offer. Cases involving the release of other Puerto Rican Nationalist prisoners have also been categorized as cases of political prisoners, with some being more vocal than others.

In criticizing President Clinton's decision to release the Puerto Rican prisoners, the conservative U.S. Senate Republican Policy Committee also categorized Pagan as a "Puerto Rican Nationalist", echoing a recent Newsweek article. In 2006, the United Nations called for the release of the remaining Puerto Rican political prisoners in United States prisons.

== Later life and death ==
In 2002, Latino Legislative Somos el Futuro conference awarded Pagan the Lifetime Achievement Award. Her archives are at Hunter College in New York and the University of Puerto Rico. She returned to Puerto Rico where she spent her final years. She died on June 30, 2024, from respiratory failure at Doctors' Center San Fernando de la Carolina Clinic in Carolina, Puerto Rico, at the age of 77.

== See also ==
- Oscar López Rivera
- Carlos Alberto Torres
- Juan Enrique Segarra-Palmer
- Edwin Cortes
- Pedro Albizu Campos
- Oscar Collazo
- Lolita Lebrón
- Puerto Rican independence movement
