= Bill Clinton pardon controversy =

Pardoning in 2001 of 450 individuals

Bill Clinton was criticized for some of his presidential pardons and acts of executive clemency. Pardoning or commuting sentences is a power granted by the Constitution to sitting U.S. presidents. Scholars describe two different models of the pardons process. In the 'agency model' of pardons the process is driven by nonpolitical legal experts in the Department of Justice. In contrast, Clinton followed the 'presidential model', viewing the pardon power as a convenient resource that could be used to advance specific policy goals.

While Clinton pardoned a far greater number (450) of people than his immediate one-term predecessor, Republican George H. W. Bush, who pardoned only 75, the number of people pardoned by Clinton was comparable to that pardoned by two-term Republican Ronald Reagan and one-term Democrat Jimmy Carter, who pardoned 393 and 534 respectively. However, Clinton chose to make nearly a third of his pardons on January 20, 2001, his last day in office. This was ridiculed as "Pardongate".

In particular, Clinton's pardon of Marc Rich, a fugitive from justice whose ex-wife made substantial donations to the Clinton Presidential Center and Hillary Clinton's campaign for the U.S. Senate, was investigated by federal prosecutor Mary Jo White. She was later replaced by Republican James Comey, who found no illegality on Clinton's part.

== FALN Commutation of 1999 ==
On August 11, 1999, Clinton commuted the sentences of 16 members of FALN, a Puerto Rican paramilitary organization that set off 120 bombs in the United States, mostly in New York City and Chicago. There were convictions for conspiracy to commit robbery, bomb-making, and sedition, as well as firearms and explosives violations. The 16 were convicted of conspiracy and sedition and sentenced with terms ranging from 35 to 105 years in prison. Clinton offered clemency on the condition that the prisoners renounce violence, seeing as none of the 16 had been convicted of harming anyone and they had already served 19 years in prison. This action was lobbied for by ten Nobel Laureates and the Archbishop of Puerto Rico. The commutation was opposed by the U.S. Attorney's Office, the FBI, and the Federal Bureau of Prisons and was criticized by many, including former victims of FALN terrorist activities and the Fraternal Order of Police. Hillary Clinton, then campaigning for her first term in the Senate, initially supported the commutation, but withdrew her support three days later.

Congress condemned this action by President Clinton, with votes of 95–2 in the Senate and 311–41 in the House. The U.S. House Committee on Government Reform held an investigation on the matter, but the Justice Department prevented FBI officials from testifying. President Clinton cited executive privilege for his refusal to turn over some documents to Congress related to his decision to offer clemency to members of the FALN terrorist group.

Among those who accepted clemency are:

- Edwin Cortes, sentenced to 35 years in prison.
- Elizam Escobar, sentenced to 60 years in prison.
- Ricardo Jimenez, sentenced to 90 years in prison.
- Adolfo Matos, sentenced to 70 years in prison.
- Dylcia Noemi Pagan, sentenced to 55 years in prison.
- Alicia Rodríguez, sentenced to 55 years in prison.
- Ida Luz Rodriguez, sentenced to 75 years in prison.
- Luis Rosa, sentenced to 75 years in prison.
- Carmen Valentin, sentenced to 90 years in prison.
- Alberto Rodriguez, sentenced to 35 years in prison.
- Alejandrina Torres, sentenced to 35 years in prison.
- Juan Enrique Segarra-Palmer, sentenced to 55 years in prison; released on 25 January 2004.

Those who rejected clemency include:

- Antonio Camacho-Negron, sentenced to 15 years in prison; released in 2006.
- Oscar López Rivera, sentenced to 70 years in prison, released in 2017 after sentence was commuted by President Barack Obama

== Edgar and Vonna Jo Gregory pardons ==
In March 2000, Bill Clinton pardoned Edgar and Vonna Jo Gregory, owners of the carnival company United Shows International, for charges of bank fraud from a 1982 conviction. Although the couple had already been released from prison, the prior conviction prevented them from doing business in certain American states. First Lady Hillary Clinton's youngest brother, Tony Rodham, was an acquaintance of the Gregorys, and had lobbied Clinton on their behalf. In October 2006, the group Judicial Watch filed a request with the U.S. Justice Department for an investigation, alleging that Rodham had received $107,000 from the Gregorys for the pardons in the form of loans that were never repaid, as part of a quid pro quo scheme.

== Pardons and commutations signed on President Clinton's final day in office ==
Clinton issued 140 pardons as well as several commutations on his last day of office, January 20, 2001. When a sentence is commuted, the conviction remains intact; however, the sentence can be altered in a number of ways.

- Peter MacDonald had been sentenced to 14 years at a federal prison in Texas for fraud, extortion, inciting riots, bribery, and corruption stemming from the Navajo purchase of the Big Boquillas Ranch in Northwestern Arizona. On the day before President Clinton left office, U.S. Rep. Patrick J. Kennedy lobbied the White House to commute the sentence of the former leader of the Navajo Nation. MacDonald's sentence was commuted after he served 10 years.
- Carlos Vignali had his sentence for cocaine trafficking commuted, after serving 6 of 15 years in federal prison.
- Almon Glenn Braswell was pardoned of his 1983 mail fraud and perjury convictions. In 1998 he was under federal investigation for money laundering and tax evasion charges. Braswell and Carlos Vignali each paid approximately $200,000 to Hillary Clinton's brother, Hugh Rodham, to represent their respective cases for clemency. Hugh Rodham returned the payments after they were disclosed to the public. Braswell would later invoke the Fifth Amendment at a Senate Committee hearing in 2001, when questioned about allegations of his having systematically defrauded senior citizens of millions of dollars.
- Linda Evans and Susan Rosenberg, members of the radical Weather Underground organization, both had sentences for weapons and explosives charges commuted: Evans served 16 years of her 40-year sentence, and Rosenberg served 16 of her 58 years.
- Marc Rich, a fugitive who had fled the U.S. during his prosecution, was residing in Switzerland. Rich owed $48 million in taxes and was charged with 51 counts for tax fraud, was pardoned of tax evasion. He was required to pay a $1 million fine and waive any use of the pardon as a defense against any future civil charges that were filed against him in the same case. Critics complained that Denise Eisenberg Rich, his former wife, had made substantial donations to both the Clinton library and to Mrs. Clinton's senate campaign. According to Paul Volcker's independent investigation of Iraqi Oil-for-Food kickback schemes, Marc Rich was a middleman for several suspect Iraqi oil deals involving over 4 million barrels (640,000 m^{3}) of oil. Longtime Clinton supporters and Democratic leaders such as former President Jimmy Carter, James Carville and Terry McAuliffe, were all critical of the Clinton pardon. Carter said the pardons were "disgraceful."
- Susan McDougal, who had already completed her sentence, was pardoned for her role in the Whitewater scandal. McDougal had served the maximum possible 18 months, including eight in solitary confinement, on contempt charges for refusing to testify about Clinton's role.
- Dan Rostenkowski, a former Democratic Congressman from Illinois and Chairman of House Ways and Means Committee, was pardoned for his role in the Congressional Post Office scandal. Rostenkowski had served 13 months of a 17-month sentence before being released in 1997. After his release from prison, Clinton granted him a pardon in December 2000.
- Mel Reynolds, a Democratic Congressman from Illinois, was convicted of bank fraud, 12 counts of sexual assault of a child, obstruction of justice, and solicitation of child pornography. His sentence was commuted on the bank fraud charge and he was allowed to serve the final months under the auspices of a halfway house. Reynolds had served his entire sentence on child sex abuse charges before the commutation of the later convictions.
- Patty Hearst, who was kidnapped by the Symbionese Liberation Army in 1974. After being isolated and threatened with death, she became supportive of their cause, making propaganda announcements for them and taking part in illegal activities. After her arrest in 1975, she was found guilty of bank robbery. The procedural correctness of her trial was upheld by the courts, although some celebrities, commentators and politicians felt it to be unjust. Hearst's sentence was commuted by President Jimmy Carter, and she was pardoned by President Bill Clinton.
- Roger Clinton, the president's brother, was pardoned for drug charges after having served the entire sentence more than a decade earlier. Roger Clinton would be charged with drunk driving and disorderly conduct in an unrelated incident within a year of the pardon. He was also briefly alleged to have been utilized in lobbying for the Braswell pardon, among others. However, no wrongdoing was uncovered.
- Harvey Weinig, a former Manhattan lawyer who was sentenced in 1996 to 11 years in prison for facilitating an extortion-kidnapping scheme and helping launder at least $19 million for the Cali cocaine cartel.
- Chris Wade, an Arkansas real estate broker involved in the Whitewater land deals who had been sentenced to prison for bank fraud and false statements on a loan application.
- Four Hasidic men from the all-Hasidic village of New Square, New York–Kalmen Stern, Jacob Elbaum, Benjamin Berger and David Goldstein–who in 1999 had been convicted of defrauding the federal government through receiving federal funding for a fictitious Jewish school, had their sentences commuted after lobbying from the village's leader, Grand Rabbi David Twersky. A federal investigation examined allegations that the pardons were part of a quid-pro-quo in exchange for Twersky instructing his followers to vote for Hillary Clinton as Senator for New York in the November 2000 election. In June 2002, federal prosecutors announced they had closed the investigation without taking any action.

On February 18, 2001, Bill Clinton wrote a New York Times column defending the 140 pardons.

== See also ==
- Second-term curse
- List of scandals with "-gate" suffix
- List of people pardoned by Bill Clinton
- List of people pardoned or granted clemency by the president of the United States
