= Alejandrina Torres =

Puerto Rican activist (born 1939)

Alejandrina Torres (born June 18, 1939) is a Puerto Rican woman whose trial as a member and role in Fuerzas Armadas de Liberación Nacional (FALN) resulted in her conviction and sentencing of 35 years for seditious conspiracy. Torres was linked to FALN, which claimed responsibility for 100 bombings and six deaths. Her sentence was commuted by President Bill Clinton in 1999.

== Early years and personal life ==
Alejandrina Torres was born in San Lorenzo, Puerto Rico in 1939 and grew up in New York City. Her family emigrated to the United States when she was 11 years old. During the 1960s and 1970s, she was a leader in her community. During the time of her arrest, she was married to Rev. Jose A. Torres and was the mother of five children. Torres continued her education to better serve her community. She was a founding member and later a teacher at the Puerto Rican High School in Chicago. She help found Chicago's Betances Health Clinic. Her work and membership in the FALN were rooted in the work made by other Puerto Rican nationalists and separatists who believed in their right to fight U.S. colonialism in relation to the History of Puerto Rico with armed resistance.

== Criminal activities, arrest and convictions ==
Torres was arrested in June 1983 at the age of 44. The arrest in April 1980 of a dozen FALN members in Evanston led to the identification of Edwin Cortes as a suspect. This led to the identification of a FALN safe-house, and subsequently that it was also used by Alejandrina Torres. The surveillance team was able to place cameras and listening equipment in the apartment. In the apartment, they found approximately 24 pounds of dynamite, 24 blasting caps, weapons, disguises, false identification and thousands of rounds of ammunition. The agents were able to neutralize all the ammunition and explosives in the apartment, by replacing the gunpowder with coconut charcoal. Using surveillance, investigators determined that the group planned to place bombs at a military facility on July 4, 1983. This prompted the arrest on June 29, 1983, of three FALN members: Edwin Cortes, Alberto Rodriguez, and Alejandrina Torres, and a fourth sympathizer (Jose Rodriguez).

=== Trial as a prisoner of war ===
At their trial proceedings, all of the arrested FALN members declared their status as prisoners of war, and refused, in general, to participate in the proceedings. They declared themselves to be combatants in an anti-colonial war against the United States to liberate Puerto Rico from U.S. domination and invoked prisoner of war status. They argued that the U.S. courts did not have jurisdiction to try them as criminals and petitioned for their cases to be handed over to an international court that would determine their status. The Federal court, however, did not recognize their request. During the trial, Cortes and Torres painted a picture of Puerto Rico as a bleak world where American corporations, particularly drug companies, conducted unethical experiments, such as birth control tests, on Puerto Rican women; where the American government systematically effaced a rich, proud Puerto Rican cultural heritage; and where the powerful, shadowy hand of the Wall Street capitalist dictated the country's politics and exploited its citizens and natural resources. Prosecutors countered: "There may be something heroic about someone who dies for his beliefs, but there is nothing heroic about someone who sneaks out into the dead of the night, plants bombs and then slinks back into the sanctuary of a safe house before the bomb detonates." Judge George Layton stated, "One of the strange things about this case is that these defendants didn't accomplish any of their purpose. The didn't succeed in springing Oscar Lopez. They didn't succeed in springing anybody from Pontiac Correctional Center. And they didn't even succeed in planting the bombs. Why? Because in this case, in this court's judgement, represents one of the finest examples of preventive law enforcement that has ever come to this court's attention ... They were going to plant bombs in public buildings during a holiday."

Torres and other FALN members had been linked to more than 100 bombings or attempted bombings since 1974 in their attempt to achieve independence for Puerto Rico. Torres was sentenced by a Federal district court to 35-years of incarceration for seditious conspiracy, bomb and weapons violations (conspiracy to make destructive devices, unlawful storage of explosives, possession of an unregistered firearm), and interstate transportation of a stolen car. Cortes and Rodriguez were convicted of conspiring to rob a Chicago Transit Authority money collector.

== Commutation of sentence by President Clinton ==
On September 10, 1999, Torres was released as one of 12 FALN members granted conditional clemency by President Clinton. All of them were required to submit a written statement renouncing the use or threatened use of violence for any purpose. Clinton cited Rev. Desmond Tutu and former President Jimmy Carter as having been influential on his decision to grant clemency to FALN prisoners. Torres was one of the eleven who accepted clemency. The other ten who accepted clemency were: Edwin Cortes, Elizam Escobar, Ricardo Jiménez, Adolfo Matos, Dylcia Noemi Pagan, Alberto Rodriguez (FALN), Alicia Rodríguez (FALN), Ida Luz Rodríguez, Luis Rosa, and Carmen Valentín Pérez.

A spokesman for the Clinton administration stated that none of the crimes for which they were convicted resulted in deaths or injuries. They pointed out that they had not been convicted of the actual bombings. Rather, they had been convicted on a variety of charges ranging from bomb making, conspiracy to armed robbery, and firearms violations. Among the other convicted Puerto Rican nationalists there were sentences of as long as 90 years in Federal prisons for offenses, that included seditious conspiracy, possession of unregistered firearms, interstate transportation of a stolen vehicle, interference with interstate commerce by violence and interstate transportation of firearms with intent to commit a crime.

President Clinton's offer of clemency to former FALN members, including Alejandrina, was strongly opposed by overwhelming bipartisan majorities in both the US House of Representatives and US Senate. In criticizing President Clinton's decision, both houses of Congress categorized the FALN members as militant terrorists, and asserted that the actions of the FALN had killed 6 persons and maimed others, including members of law enforcement.

== Challenges of political imprisonment ==
The sentences given to the FALN members were judged by some to be "out of proportion to the nationalists' offenses", and almost 20 times greater than sentences for similar offenses by the American population at large.

For many years, numerous national and international organizations criticized Torres' incarceration categorizing it as political imprisonment. Cases involving the other Puerto Rican Nationalist prisoners have also been categorized by some as cases of political prisoners. The Lexington, Kentucky facility where Torres was imprisoned was sharply criticized by Amnesty International and its closure was eventually ordered by U.S. District Judge Barrington Parker.

There were reports of human rights violations against the FALN prisoners. The prisoners were placed in prisons far from their families, some were sexually assaulted by prison personnel, some were denied adequate medical attention, and others were kept in isolated underground prison cells for no reason. Amnesty International and the House of Representatives' Subcommittee on Courts, Intellectual Property and the Administration of Justice both criticized the conditions. The conditions were found to be in violation of the U.N. Standard Minimum Rules for the Treatment of Prisoners. A federal judge also expressed concerns regarding FALN prisoners held at the Female High Security Unit, Lexington, Kentucky. In the case of Baraldini vs. Meese, the judge found that their exceptionally restrictive conditions of detention were not in response to any legitimate security threat, and were therefore "an exaggerated response" and in violation of the prisoners' First Amendment rights.

=== Experience in prison ===
Throughout her imprisonment, Torres was plagued by health problems which were aggravated by prison staff's attacks and an indifference to her medical needs. Further, she faced physical abuse during her incarceration. It took the federal prison system six years to place her in a regular women's prison. Two of those six years were spent in the underground Women's High Security Unit at Lexington, Kentucky. Amnesty International condemned the conditions in that unit as "deliberately and gratuitously oppressive" and as causing physical and psychological deterioration.

Torres was one of four subjects housed in an experimental prison unit in Kentucky. The High Security Unit (HSU) was a kind of prison within a prison, occupying the basement of the Federal Correctional Institute. Allegations were made that the unit was an experimental underground political prison that practiced isolation and sensory deprivation. It was finally closed by a federal judge after two years of protest by religious and human rights groups. She was then moved to the federal women's prison in Danbury, Connecticut, from which she was released in September 1999.

=== Allegations of human rights violations ===
Torres was also sexually assaulted multiple times in cases involving prison personnel with the assailants never being charged. The attacks occurred in three different prisons. The first assault took place when she was locked in a men's unit, permitting the men to exhibit themselves in front of her. In a second incident, a male prison lieutenant forced her to put her head between his knees and observed while female guards tore off her clothes and left her naked. The authorities responded to Torres' complaint in this case by placing her in solitary confinement, prohibiting from calling her family and lawyer to denounce the abuses. She was further penalized for violating prison rules, and a secret letter was written to a judge assigned to her case giving a false version of the events. In the third case, female prison guards held her while a male guard inserted his fingers in her vagina and her anus during an alleged "search". The warden who ordered the search admitted later that he did not suspect Torres of having contraband, and that the search was in violation of prison rules.
