= Avelino González-Claudio =

Puerto Rican activist

- Born: October 8, 1942; Vega Baja, Puerto Rico
- Died: July 9, 2019 (aged 76)

Avelino González-Claudio (October 8, 1942, Vega Baja, Puerto Rico – July 9, 2019) was a Puerto Rican independence activist who served time in a U.S. federal prison for his participation in the more than US$7 million (equivalent to more than $22.1 million in 2024) Águila Blanca armored truck robbery planned by Los Macheteros. Although the robbery took place in 1983, González-Claudio was not apprehended until 25 years later, in 2008. After pleading guilty to conspiracy to commit robbery, González-Claudio was sentenced to seven years in prison in 2010. He was released three years later, in 2013.

== The robbery ==
On September 12, 1983, a Wells Fargo armored truck in Hartford, Connecticut, was robbed of more than US$7 million (equivalent to more than $22.1 million in 2024). The robbery, code-named "Águila Blanca" ("White Eagle"), was "the largest cash heist in U.S. history" at the time of its commission.

== Arrests ==
In 1985, González-Claudio was accused in absentia of having planned the robbery as a member of Los Macheteros. González-Claudio was apprehended in 2008, after more than 20 years as a fugitive and during which time he had adopted an alias that allowed him to work as a teacher in Puerto Rico. He pleaded guilty to conspiracy for robbery and, in 2010, was sentenced to seven years in prison. Prosecutors argued for the necessity of a substantial sentence in spite of González-Claudio's age and Parkinson's disease, fearing that he could still be influential in the Los Macheteros organization, as authorities had found in February 2008 "documents in Gonzalez-Claudio's home that they say showed he was still involved with the group." Gonzalez-Claudio was released from prison on 5 February 2013. During his time as a fugitive he communicated with his wife via correspondence.

In May 2011, his brother Norberto González-Claudio was arrested for his participation in the robbery. Norberto was released on January 15, 2015.

== Death ==
Avelino Gonzalez-Claudio died on July 9, 2019 at age 76.

== See also ==
- Oscar López Rivera
- Carlos Alberto Torres
- Juan Enrique Segarra-Palmer
- Edwin Cortes
- Pedro Albizu Campos
- Oscar Collazo
- Lolita Lebrón
- Puerto Rican independence movement
