= Norman Ramirez-Talavera =

Puerto Rican activist

Norman Ramirez-Talavera is a Puerto Rican nationalist who had the fines imposed on him in the 1983 armored car robbery in West Hartford, Connecticut, case remitted under the terms of President Bill Clinton's clemency offer on September 7, 1999. Maldonado-Rivera had already served the terms of his prison sentence and had been released several years prior to Clinton's offer.

== See also ==
- Oscar Collazo
- Alejandrina Torres
- Puerto Rican independence movement
