= Diana Block =

US author and former militant

Diana Block (born c. 1950) is a US-based former militant and author. During the 1970s, she joined the Prairie Fire Organizing Committee and later went underground with a group accused of buying explosives to aid the independence movement in Puerto Rico. Whilst on the run, Block had two children with her partner and fellow militant Claude Marks. They resurfaced in 1994 and Block has since published a memoir and a novel.

== Life ==
Diana Block was born c. 1950 in the US and grew up in the San Francisco Bay Area. During the 1970s, she joined the Prairie Fire Organizing Committee and became involved in radical social movements such as feminism and the independence movement in Puerto Rico. In 1981, she moved to Los Angeles and went underground as part of a militant group which used its white privilege to buy explosives to be used in freeing Fuerzas Armadas de Liberación Nacional Puertorriqueña (FALN) prisoner Oscar López Rivera. The explosives were sold by an undercover FBI agent and four years later, her partner and fellow militant Claude Marks discovered a FBI surveillance device underneath their car. Block had just given birth to a child and the discovery prompted the entire group to change location and identity.

Block had a second child and lived underground with Marks in Pittsburgh until 1994, when the pair gave themselves up to the authorities in a negotiated settlement. She faced no charges; he was imprisoned for four years then released. Block formed the California Coalition for Women Prisoners and wrote her memoir Arm the Spirit: A Woman's Journey Underground and Back, which was published in 2009. In 2015, Block published Clandestine Occupations: An Imaginary History, a novel based on real events in the 1960s and 1970s. Reviewing the book for Truthout, Dan Berger said it was "a nuanced and intimate portrayal of radical activism's far-reaching consequences."

== Selected works ==
- Block, Diana (2015). Clandestine Occupations: An Imaginary History. Oakland, CA: PM Press. ISBN 9781629631219.
- Block, Diana (2009). Arm the Spirit: A Woman's Journey Underground and Back. Oakland, CA: AK Press. ISBN 9781904859871.
