= High Security Unit =

Coordinates: 38°06′20″N 84°33′37″W

High Security Unit (HSU) was a "control" unit for women within the Federal Medical Center in Lexington, Kentucky. In the less than two years that the HSU was operational it became a focus of national and international concern over human rights abuses.

It was opened in 1986 by the U.S. Federal Bureau of Prisons (BOP). This special unit of 16 isolation cells was sealed off in a basement from the other prisoners. Reports from different human rights organization including Amnesty International brought the attention to the existence of the unit and the inhumane treatment of prisoners.

== Conditions ==
The HSU prisoners lived in constant artificial lights 24 hours a day. Personal property was forbidden. Camera and visual surveillance recorded every activity. There were periods when the guards experimented with sleep deprivation: waking the prisoners every hour during the night. When prisoners filed complaints, the guards started waking them every half hour. Contact with the outside world was sharply restricted: Visitations were limited. There were frequent cavity searches done by male guards considered "constant sexual harassment" by the reports.

In August 1987, Dr. Richard Korn, a clinical psychologist and correctional expert issued a report for the American Civil Liberties Union's National Prison Project. Dr. Korn concluded that HSU was designed to force "ideological conversion".

== Political and legal opposition ==
A report by the United Methodist Church concluded that the extreme isolation of the unit was cruel and unusual punishment. A 38-page report by Amnesty International said that the HSU was violating the international standards of treatment of prisoners.

A lawsuit was filed in behalf of prisoners Silvia Baraldini and Susan Rosenberg. It challenged regulations that allowed the isolation of prisoners based on their political beliefs or affiliations. United States District Judge Barrington D. Parker said in his ruling that: '"The treatment of the plaintiffs has skirted elemental standards of human decency. The exaggerated security, small group isolation and staff harassment serve to constantly undermine the inmates' morale." He ordered the Bureau of Prisons to rewrite its regulations and transfer the prisoners into the general prison population.

In response to mounting opposition the Bureau of Prisons closed the facility in 1988.

== Inmates ==
The facility never housed more than seven women. They were officially labeled "high risk," though none of them was convicted of a "violent" act while in prison. Some of them were chosen because of their radical political beliefs:

- Marie Haydée Beltrán Torres: Puerto Rican FALN member convicted for the 1977 bombing that killed one individual at the Mobil Oil Building in Manhattan.
- Silvia Baraldini: She was active in both the Black Power and Puerto Rican independence movements in the United States in the 1960s thru 1980s.
- Susan Rosenberg: A former member of the May 19th Communist Organization (sentence commuted by President Clinton in 2001).
- Alejandrina Torres: A former member of FALN (granted clemency by President Clinton in 1999).
- Squeaky Fromme A former Manson family member in prison for an attempted assassination of Gerald Ford.
- Bonnie Kelly Convicted of Murder of a Florida prosecutor.
- Debra Jo Brown convicted of an interstate murder spree with Alton Coleman.

== See also ==
- CMU Prison
