= Marie Haydée Beltrán Torres =

Puerto Rican nationalist

- Born: Marie Haydée Beltrán Torres; 27 June 1955 (age 71); Arecibo, Puerto Rico

Marie Haydée Beltrán Torres (born 7 June 1955) is a Puerto Rican nationalist who was convicted and sentenced to life in prison for the 1977 bombing of the Mobil Oil Building in Manhattan that killed one person and injured several others. Torres was linked by a fingerprint on a job application she filled at the Mobil building just before the bombing. She and her husband, Carlos Torres, were members of the Fuerzas Armadas de Liberación Nacional (FALN), which claimed responsibility for the Mobil Oil bombing and numerous others. Supporters of Torres considered her a political prisoner. She was released on April 14, 2009.

== Trial ==
At her trial, Beltrán Torres refused the appointment of counsel, demanded to represent herself and then informed the district court that she would neither present a defense nor participate in the proceedings. Declaring her status as a prisoner of war, she stated that the court proceedings were "illegal" and that she had "committed no crime", and demanded that her case be tried before an international court.

During the trial, she declined to the legal representation she was provided. She was convicted on May 22, 1980, of placing the bomb that killed the 26-year-old Charles Steinberg and injured seven others in the Mobil Oil Building bombing.

Torres was one of a few FALN members who was not offered clemency by President Clinton. Clemency was offered only to 16 individuals, who had not been convicted, according to the White House counsel, of killing and maiming. In August 1997, The United States Court of Appeals for the Second Circuit denied her appeal to vacate her sentence. Beltrán Torres claimed she was denied her constitutional rights under the Fifth, Sixth and Eighth Amendments.

== Imprisonment ==
Beltrán Torres was one of the first subjects of an experimental prison unit in Alderson, West Virginia. The High Security Unit (HSU) was a kind of prison within a prison, occupying a completely isolated unit of the Federal Correctional Institute. Allegations were made that the unit was an experimental underground political prison that practiced isolation and sensory deprivation. It was finally closed by a federal judge after two years of protest by religious and human rights groups.

== See also ==
- Fuerzas Armadas de Liberación Nacional Puertorriqueña

== References and primary source ==
- Marie Haydee Beltran Torres vs. United States of America (complete text) Retrieved on 2008-11-19
