= Carlos Alberto Torres (Puerto Rican nationalist) =

Puerto Rican nationalist

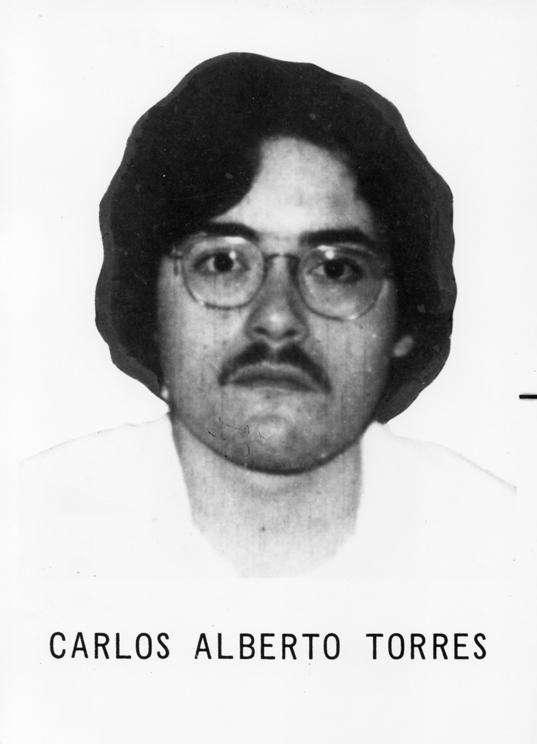

FBI Ten Most Wanted Fugitive

Description
- Born: September 19, 1952 (age 74); Ponce, Puerto Rico

Status
- Convictions: Sedition
- Penalty: 30 years to life
- Added: October 19, 1977
- Caught: April 4, 1980
- Number: 356
- Captured

Carlos Alberto Torres (born September 19, 1952) is a militant Puerto Rican nationalist. He was convicted and sentenced to 78 years in a U.S. federal prison for seditious conspiracy, conspiring to use force against the lawful authority of the United States. He served 30 years and was released on parole on July 26, 2010.

== Crimes ==
Torres was convicted of a seditious conspiracy carried out by the Fuerzas Armadas de Liberación Nacional (FALN), which claimed responsibility for numerous bombings, leading to six deaths. He was first linked to the criminal conspiracy carried out by the FALN in 1976. That year, a burglar was arrested in Chicago who was attempting to peddle stolen explosives. The burglar led the Chicago police to an apartment, owned by Torres and nearly void of furniture, but there were boxes containing explosives and bomb-making paraphernalia, weapons, clothing, wigs, and photographs of Chicago buildings, maps of the city, and several FALN documents, including a manual for guerrilla warfare detailing deceptive practices and rules of clandestine living titled Posición Política.

The bomb factory was also linked to Oscar López Rivera and his wife, Ida Luz Rodriguez as well as to Torres' wife, Marie Haydée Beltrán. All four became fugitives after the discovery. The four suspects were also linked to the National Commission on Hispanic Affairs (NCHA) of the Protestant Episcopal Church, a charitable organization based in New York City, meant to fund projects to assist Hispanic communities throughout the United States.

The next break in the investigation occurred in 1980, when 11 FALN members, including Carlos Torres and his wife, were arrested during a planned robbery of armored truck in Evanston, Illinois. The case of his wife, Torres Beltran, was adjudicated in New York because fingerprint evidence was able to identify her as the person placing the bomb that killed 26-year-old Charles Prendergast, at the Mobil office building in New York in 1977. Carlos Torres and most of the others arrested in Evanston were convicted of seditious conspiracy among other charges.

He was released on 26 July 2010, after 30 years in prison. In the 1970s, Torres was listed for three years as one of the Ten Most Wanted Fugitives during the 1970s.

== Education ==
He attended Oak Park and River Forest High School in Oak Park, Illinois. While in jail, Torres obtained a university degree, worked in the Department of Education, and became a painter and artisan.

== Sentence ==
Some partisans claim Torres was among the longest-serving Puerto Rican political prisoners. Another FALN prisoner, Oscar López Rivera, spent 36 years in prison before his release on February 9, 2017. López Rivera had years added to his sentences due to a violent conspiracy to escape from prison. In 1999, the continued incarceration of Torres was strongly supported in a resolution that labeled the FALN as a terrorist organization, approved by overwhelming bipartisan majorities in both the US House of Representatives (in a vote of 311 in favor and 41 against) and the US Senate (95-2).

Several human rights organizations, including the American Association of Jurists, called for the release of Alberto Torres. Torres was not included in the President Bill Clinton's 1999 clemency offer to other FALN members.

President Clinton said he refused to commute Torres' sentence because he "was identified as the leader of the group, and had made statements that he was involved in a revolution against the United States and that his actions had been legitimate." Torres was incarcerated for 30 years and, had he not been paroled in May, 2010, he would have been jailed until 2024.

== Release proceedings ==
In January 2009, Torres was scheduled for a parole hearing, after serving 29 years behind bars. On the eve of his hearing, prison authorities accused him and eight of his cellmates of possessing knives which the tenth cellmate had hidden in the light fixture of the cell. On July 28, the Parole board notified Torres they would postpone their decision for at least 90 days, pending resolution of the charges. Two days later, the prison disciplinary hearing officer held hearings on the weapons charges. His defense was a denial of possession of the contraband. The tenth cellmate appeared as a witness, admitting that the knives were his, and his alone, and that Torres and the other cellmates had not known of the hidden knives in the light fixture. The guilty party also provided a sworn statement to this effect. The disciplinary hearing officer nevertheless found them guilty of possessing the hidden weapons.

== Parole and release ==
Torres was granted parole in May 2010, and released on July 26, 2010. Torres flew to his homeland island of Puerto Rico on 29 July to a hero's welcome. An activity was organized at the Don Pedro Albizu Campos Park, located across the street from the Tenerías sector of Barrio Machuelo Abajo, Ponce, where Torres was born on September 1, 1952. This is the same place in Ponce where Pedro Albizu Campos, another independence advocate, was born.

== Other prisoners ==
Marie Haydée Beltrán, wife of Torres, was arrested alongside her husband in Illinois. She tried in New York and convicted to life in prison for the 1977 FALN bombing of the Mobil Oil Building in Manhattan that killed one person and injured several others. Torres was linked by a fingerprint on a job application she filled at the Mobil building just before the bombing. Torres was released on April 14, 2009.

Oscar Lopez Rivera who, like Torres, also became a fugitive in 1976, was arrested in 1981. He was also convicted of seditious conspiracy due to his participation in the FALN, as well as other offenses. He served 12 years of a 70-year sentence in isolation. Nevertheless, he rejected Clinton's conditioned offer of an early release and remains in prison. His projected release date was scheduled for June 26, 2023. On January 17, 2017, President Obama commuted Oscar Lopez Rivera's sentence. He was released on May 17, 2017.

Another Puerto Rican nationalist who was jailed is Avelino González-Claudio. He was the leader of the Federation of University Students pro Independence (FUPI) and the Pro Independence Movement (MPI) during the years he spent in New York. In 1985, González Claudio was accused in abstencia of having planned a $6 million robbery to Wells Fargo in Hartford, Connecticut, as a member of the Macheteros. He was apprehended in 2008, pleaded guilty and was sentenced to seven years in prison. He was released on February 5, 2013. Since 2006, the United Nations has called for the release of all Puerto Rican political prisoners in United States prisons.

== See also ==
- Oscar López Rivera
- Juan Enrique Segarra-Palmer
- Edwin Cortes
- Pedro Albizu Campos
- Oscar Collazo
- Lolita Lebrón
- Puerto Rican independence movement
