= Carlos Vignali =

American drug trafficker

Carlos Anibal Vignali had his federal prison sentence commuted by President of the United States Bill Clinton just prior to leaving office, as a part of a group of commutations and pardons. At the time, he was serving the sixth of 15 years in prison for organized cocaine trafficking. Carlos Vignali's attorney during his trial and sentencing was prominent Minnesota attorney, Ronald I. Meshbesher.

The sentence commutation, while not a "pardon", was controversial because there are claims that it was a consequence of Carlos's father, Horacio Carlos Vignali's, monetary contributions to politicians such as United States Congressman Xavier Becerra and California State Assembly Speakers Antonio Villaraigosa and Robert Hertzberg, who in turn petitioned Clinton for the younger Vignali's release. However, Clinton's sentence commutation was ostensibly motivated by the harsh minimum sentencing for drug related offenses as part of the war on drugs, but it is claimed that Carlos A. Vignali was a relatively big offender who was probably less deserving of a pardon than many other convicted persons who are not as well connected. Vignali's father possesses large holdings of commercial real estate in Downtown Los Angeles, and Vignali today is active in his father's real estate businesses.

Villaraigosa's petitioning Clinton for Vignali's release was used against him successfully by James K. Hahn as an issue in the 2001 Los Angeles mayoral election. Hahn attempted to use the issue again in the 2005 mayoral election against both Villaraigosa and Hertzberg in the primaries, and against Villaraigosa in the runoff, but was unable to use this issue for political gain again and lost the election.
