= European Nuclear Energy Tribunal =

The European Nuclear Energy Tribunal (ENET) is an international tribunal, established on 1 January 1960, that operates under the auspices of the Organisation for Economic Co-operation and Development (OECD). The States Parties to the Security Control Convention are Austria, Belgium, Denmark, France, Germany, Ireland, Italy, Luxembourg, the Netherlands, Norway, Portugal, Spain, Sweden, Switzerland, Turkey, and the United Kingdom; the States Parties to the Paris Convention are Belgium, Denmark, Finland, France, Germany, Greece, Italy, the Netherlands, Norway, Portugal, Slovenia, Spain, Sweden, Switzerland, Turkey, and the United Kingdom. The tribunal was established by the Convention on the Establishment of the Security Control in the Field of Nuclear Energy, signed in 1957.

The tribunal has jurisdiction over disputes between Contracting Parties concerning the interpretation or application of the Paris Convention on Third Party Liability in the Field of Nuclear Energy and the Brussels Convention Supplementary to the Paris Convention. Formerly, it also had jurisdiction over disputes arising from the nuclear security control mechanism operated by the OECD, but implementation of that mechanism was suspended in 1976 to avoid duplication with the IAEA and Euratom systems.

The tribunal consists of seven judges appointed to five-year terms.

The OECD Council appointed judges for a term from 1 January 2025 to 31 December 2029, with Mr. Hans Georg Seiler serving as the President of the Tribunal. The appointed judges come from Austria, Belgium, Denmark, France, Germany, Switzerland, and Turkey.

The Registrar of the Tribunal is currently Kimberly Sexton Nick. Located at the OECD headquarters in Paris, France, the Tribunal's seat is established by Article 7(b) of its Protocol.

There have been no cases submitted to the Tribunal so far.
