= Puerto Rico Pro-Independence University Federation =

Non-profit student organization that advocates for the independence of Puerto Rico

The Pro-Independence University Federation of Puerto Rico (Spanish: Federación Universitaria Pro Independencia or FUPI) is a non-profit student organization that advocates for the independence of Puerto Rico. The Federation was founded in October 1956 by Hugo Margenat, a Puerto Rican poet and nationalist. In 1960, COINTELPRO operations began against the Movimiento Pro Independencia (MPI), the University Pro-Independence Federation (FUPI), and many other Puerto Rican independence organizations both on the island and in the communities of the Puerto Rican diaspora in the United States.
