= Antonio Camacho-Negron =

Antonio Camacho-Negron, born October 6, 1945, in Yauco, Puerto Rico, is a Puerto Rican nationalist who was convicted in Connecticut in June 1989 of conspiracy to rob a bank and foreign transportation of stolen money in relation to the White Eagle bank robbery. He was sentenced to 15 years in a U.S. federal prison for charges involving sedition, possession of unregistered firearms, interstate transportation of a stolen vehicle, interference with interstate commerce by violence and interstate transportation of firearms with intent to commit a crime. None of the crimes resulted in deaths or injuries.

Camacho was among the 16 Puerto Rican nationalists offered conditional clemency by U.S. President Bill Clinton in 1999. It offered to have his fine remitted and required from him in exchange for a written promise "renouncing the use or threatened use of violence for any purpose". He rejected the terms of Clinton's offer.

Camacho-Negron had been previously released on parole but was returned to prison in February 1998 for associating with people active in the independence movement and becoming involved again himself. It was after this return to prison that Camacho-Negron received the clemency offer from Clinton.

Camacho-Negron was released from prison on September 1, 2006.
