= Edwin Cortes =

Puerto Rican activist

- Penalty: Sedition

Edwin Cortes was a Puerto Rican nationalist and member of the FALN who received a sentence of 35 years for seditious conspiracy and other charges. He was sentenced on October 5, 1985, and incarcerated in a U.S. federal prison. However, he was released early from prison, after President Bill Clinton extended a clemency offer to him on February 19, 1999.

== Criminal activities, arrest and conviction ==
Cortes and 11 others were arrested on April 4, 1980, in Evanston, Illinois. They had been linked to more than 100 bombings or attempted bombings since 1974 in their attempt to achieve independence for Puerto Rico. At their trial proceedings, some of the arrested declared their status as prisoners of war, and refused to participate in the proceedings.

The arrest in April 1980 of a dozen FALN members in Evanston led to the identification of Edwin Cortes as a suspect. Nicknamed The Rabbit by law enforcement, a large team of local and federal agents placed him under nearly constant surveillance, which was used to identify a FALN safe house, which then was placed under surveillance.

The surveillance team was able to place cameras and listening equipment in the apartment. In the apartment, they found approximately 24 pounds of dynamite, 24 blasting caps, weapons, disguises, false identification and thousands of rounds of ammunition. The agents were able to neutralize all the ammunition and explosives in the apartment, by replacing the gunpowder with coconut charcoal.

These actions plus information derived from continued surveillance foiled an attempt to free Oscar Lopez Rivera from jail during a trip to a hospital in mid March 1983. In addition, they forestalled similar escape attempts targeted for other FALN prisoners, housed near Bloomington, Illinois.

Using surveillance, investigators documented Edwin Cortes training Alberto Rodriguez on how to build a bomb; evaluate the perimeter of Army Reserve Center and GSA facility at 74th and Pulaski; and plan to place bombs on July 4 of 1983. This prompted the arrest on June 29, 1983, of Cortes, Alberto Rodriguez, and Alejandrina Torres and a fourth sympathizer (Jose Rodriguez).

During the trial, Cortes and Torres painted a picture of Puerto Rico as a bleak world where American corporations, particularly drug companies, conducted unethical experiments, such as birth control tests, on Puerto Rican women; where the American government systematically effaced a rich, proud Puerto Rican cultural heritage; and where the powerful, shadowy hand of the Wall Street capitalist dictated the country`s politics and exploited its citizens and natural resources. They and their witnesses asserted that George Washington was a slave holder, that U.S. domination over Puerto Rico was illegal and that the FBI historically targeted the FALN for infiltration, disruption and annihilation. They invoked the names of freedom fighters from Northern Ireland, Puerto Rico, Nicaragua and elsewhere; attacked the legitimacy of the 1898 treaty with Spain ceding Puerto Rico to the U.S.; accused government authorities of enslaving Puerto Rican nationals in a "cocoon of ignorance"; and cited a United Nations resolution that sanctioned war against colonialism.

The prosecutors countered: There may be something heroic about someone who dies for his beliefs, but there is nothing heroic about someone who sneaks out into the dead of the night, plants bombs and then slinks back into the sanctuary of a safe house before the bomb detonates.

The three FALN members were found guilty of seditious conspiracy and sentenced to 35 years of prison each. In addition, the jury found Torres and Cortes guilty of bomb and weapons violations, interstate transportation of a stolen car and possession of an unlicensed silencer. Cortes and Rodriguez were convicted of conspiring to rob a Chicago Transit Authority money collector.

None of the bombings of which they were convicted resulted in deaths or injuries. Cortes was given a 35-year federal sentence for seditious conspiracy and other charges.

== Seditious conspiracy and human rights violations ==
There were reports of human rights violations against the FALN prisoners. The prisoners were placed in prisons far from their families, some were sexually assaulted by prison personnel, some were denied adequate medical attention, and others were kept in isolated underground prison cells for no reason. Amnesty International and the House of Representatives' Subcommittee on Courts, Intellectual Property and the Administration of Justice both criticized the conditions. The conditions were found to be in violation of the U.N. Standard Minimum Rules for the Treatment of Prisoners. A federal judge also expressed concerns regarding FALN prisoners held at the Female High Security Unit, Lexington, Kentucky. In the case of Baraldini vs. Meese, the judge found that their exceptionally restrictive conditions of detention were not in response to any legitimate security threat, and were therefore "an exaggerated response" and in violation of the prisoners' First Amendment rights.

== Political prisoner ==
For many years, numerous national and international organizations criticized Cortes' incarceration categorizing it as political imprisonment.

== Clemency and release from prison ==
Cortes was released from prison on September 10, 1999 after President Bill Clinton extended clemency to him. Clinton cited Rev. Desmond Tutu and former President Jimmy Carter as having been influential on his decision to grant Cortes the clemency offer. Cases involving the release of other Puerto Rican Nationalist prisoners have also been categorized as cases of political prisoners.

The sentences received by Cortes and the other Nationalists were judged to be "out of proportion to the nationalists' offenses." In criticizing President Clinton's decision to release the Puerto Rican prisoners, the conservative U.S. Senate Republican Policy Committee also categorized Cortes as a "Puerto Rican Nationalist", echoing a recent Newsweek article. In 2006, the United Nations called for the release of the remaining Puerto Rican political prisoners in United States prisons.

No one granted clemency was convicted in any of the actual bombings. Rather, they had been convicted on a variety of charges ranging from bomb making and conspiracy to armed robbery and firearms violations. They were all convicted for sedition, the act of attempting to overthrow the Government of the United States in Puerto Rico by force.

Had President Clinton not offered clemency, Cortes would have been released in 2004.

== See also ==
- Oscar López Rivera
- Carlos Alberto Torres
- Juan Enrique Segarra-Palmer
- Pedro Albizu Campos
- Oscar Collazo
- Lolita Lebrón
- Puerto Rican independence movement
