= Oscar López Rivera =

Puerto Rican activist (born 1943)

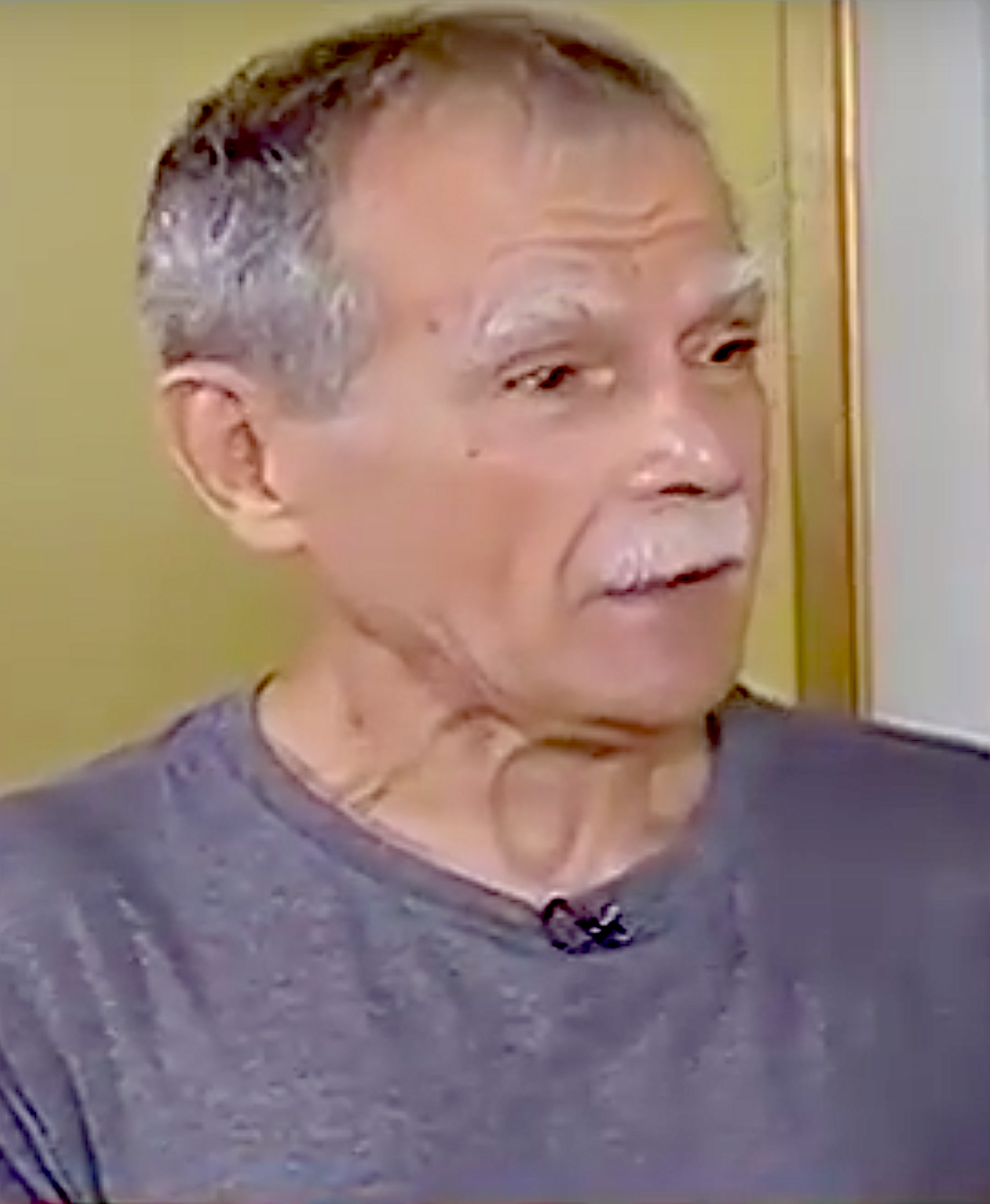
- López Rivera in 2017
- Born: January 6, 1943 (age 83); San Sebastián, Puerto Rico
- Known for: Longest-incarcerated FALN member
- Awards: Bronze Star Medal
- Status: Sentence commuted by President Obama, sentence ended in May 2017
- Criminal charges: Seditious conspiracy, use of force to commit robbery, interstate transportation of firearms and ammunition to aid in the commission of a felony
- Penalty: Prison for 55 years; extended 15 years for later conspiracy to escape

Oscar López Rivera (born January 6, 1943) is a Puerto Rican activist and militant who was a member and suspected leader of the Fuerzas Armadas de Liberación Nacional Puertorriqueña (FALN), a clandestine paramilitary organization devoted to Puerto Rican independence that carried out more than 130 bomb attacks in the United States between 1974 and 1983. López Rivera was tried by the United States government for seditious conspiracy, use of force to commit robbery, interstate transportation of firearms, and conspiracy to transport explosives with intent to destroy government property.

López Rivera declared himself a prisoner of war and refused to take part in most of his trial. He maintained that according to international law he was an anticolonial combatant and could not be prosecuted by the United States government. On August 11, 1981, López Rivera was convicted and sentenced to 55 years in federal prison. On February 26, 1988, he was sentenced to an additional 15 years in prison for conspiring to escape from the Leavenworth prison.

López Rivera was not directly linked to any specific bombings. Many considered him to be the world's longest-held political prisoner, with a number of political and religious groups calling for his release. U.S. President Bill Clinton offered him and 13 other convicted FALN members conditional clemency in 1999; López Rivera rejected the offer on the grounds that not all incarcerated FALN members received pardons. In January 2017, President Barack Obama commuted López Rivera's sentence; he was released in May 2017, having served 36 years in prison, longer than any other member of the FALN.

== Early years and personal life ==
Oscar López Rivera was born in San Sebastián, Puerto Rico, on January 6, 1943. His family moved to Chicago when he was nine years old. At the age of 14, he followed them to Chicago. At age 18 he was drafted into the army and served in the Vietnam War, where he earned a Bronze Star Medal.

When he returned to Illinois in 1967, he became a community activist, advocating for housing for the Puerto Rican community, bilingual education and Latino recruitment in the university system. In the late 1970s he began to advocate for Puerto Rican independence.

López Rivera was one of the founders of La Escuelita Puertorriqueña, now known as the Dr. Pedro Albizu Campos High School and the Juan Antonio Corretjer Puerto Rican Cultural Center. He was a community organizer for the Northwest Community Organization (NCO), ASSPA, ASPIRA and the 1st Congregational Church of Chicago. He helped to found FREE, a half-way house for convicted drug addicts, and ALAS, an educational program for Latino prisoners at Stateville Prison in Illinois.

== FALN activities ==
López Rivera joined the Fuerzas Armadas de Liberación Nacional Puertorriqueña (FALN), an organization which in the 1970s fought to make Puerto Rico an independent country. The FALN was involved in more than 100 bombings in New York, Chicago and other cities, including the 1975 bombing at Fraunces Tavern in Manhattan that killed four people. López Rivera was never conclusively linked to the bombings. The FALN was one of the targets of the first terrorism task force in the United States; the US Joint Terrorism Task Force (JTTF), established in April 1980, had as one of its goals to pursue threats from the Armed Forces of National Liberation (FALN).

López Rivera was first linked to the FALN in 1976. That year, a burglar was arrested in Chicago attempting to peddle stolen explosives. The burglar led the Chicago police to an apartment, nearly devoid of furniture, but in which there were boxes containing explosives and bomb-making paraphernalia, weapons, clothing, wigs, and photographs of Chicago buildings, maps of the city, and several FALN documents, including a manual for guerrilla warfare detailing deceptive practices and rules of clandestine living titled Posición Política. (Note: A few excerpts and commentary on Posición Política are available online.) This bomb factory was linked to the owner of the apartment, Carlos Torres, López Rivera, and their respective wives, Marie Haydée Beltrán Torres and Ida Luz Rodríguez. All four became fugitives after this discovery. The four were also linked to the National Commission on Hispanic Affairs (NCHA) of the Protestant Episcopal Church, a charitable organization based in New York City that was meant to fund projects to assist Hispanic communities throughout the United States.

On April 4, 1980, 11 FALN members, including Rodríguez and Beltrán Torres, were arrested trying to rob an armored truck in Evanston, Illinois. Beltran was subsequently convicted of the 1977 bombing of the Mobil Oil building, that resulted in one death. López Rivera was apprehended one year later on May 29, 1981, when, according to police, he ran a stop sign in Glenview, a Chicago suburb and provided a false Oregon driver's license.

At the time of their arrest, López Rivera and the others declared themselves combatants in an anti-colonial war against the United States to gain Puerto Rico's independence from the U.S., and claimed prisoner of war status. They stated that U.S. courts did not have jurisdiction to treat them as criminals, and petitioned for their cases to be handed over to an international court that would determine their status. The U.S. Government did not recognize their request.

== Trial ==
López Rivera was tried in U.S. District Court for Northern Illinois in 1980–81. The charges included armed robbery and for being a recruiter and bomb-making trainer in the FALN. No one was injured in any of the bombings in which López Rivera was accused of being involved.

In August 1981, Alfredo Méndez, one of those arrested in Evanston who had become an informant, testified that López Rivera taught him how to make bomb detonation devices and gun silencers. He also testified that the first bombing in which Méndez was to have taken part planned to target the hotel that housed the offices for the Democratic Party. Méndez stated that other bombings were scheduled to occur simultaneously in New York City, Puerto Rico, and Washington, D.C. Speaking on his own behalf during closing arguments, López Rivera stated, "Puerto Rico will be a free and socialist country" and denounced Méndez as a traitor. López Rivera was convicted of "seditious conspiracy, use of force to commit robbery, interstate transportation of firearms and ammunition to aid in the commission of a felony, and interstate transportation of stolen vehicles".

U.S. District Judge Thomas R. McMillen sentenced López Rivera to 55 years in prison, calling him an "incorrigible law violator".

López Rivera maintained that he was a prisoner of war and refused to participate in most of the trial. In 1995, in interviews after his conviction, López Rivera neither confirmed nor denied his affiliation with the FALN and disowned any personal involvement in the bombing deaths linked to the FALN. He asserted his belief in the legitimacy of political violence: "By international law, a colonized people has the right to fight against colonialism by any means necessary, including the use of force."

== Escape plot and second trial ==
On August 20, 1986, a federal grand jury indicted López Rivera and several others for planning to engineer his escape, and that of another inmate, from Leavenworth. The government described plans to use hand grenades, plastic explosives, blasting caps, and a helicopter. (Note: Claude Daniels Marks and Donna Jean Willmott, two of the FBI's most wanted fugitives of the 1980s, voluntarily surrendered to police in Pittsburgh in 1994 (with their respective partners Diana Block and Rob McBride) after their attorneys negotiated a plea bargain agreement in return for their pleading guilty to participation in the conspiracy to free López Rivera. In 1985, they had purchased explosives, which proved to be fake, from an undercover FBI agent and had gone into hiding after discovering a listening device in their car.) The government also claimed it knew of a failed 1983 escape plot, but had not arrested the conspirators in order to maintain surveillance of their activities.

The jury deliberated for four days and returned guilty verdicts against all four defendants on December 31, 1987. López Rivera was convicted on five of the eight counts on which he had been charged.

His attorney, Jan Susler, continued to charge the government with devising the conspiracy. She said: "The way this case was done was down and dirty. The Government, through their informants, agents provocateur and undercover FBI agents spent millions trying to create a conspiracy to get these defendants." (Note: The other defendants were Grailing Brown, a Leavenworth inmate who had been convicted of murder; Dora Garcia, Lopez's former sister-in-law; and Jaime Delgado. Others were indicted but not apprehended.)

On February 27, 1988, U.S. District Judge William Hart sentenced López Rivera to fifteen years in prison. He said: "Those who take up the sword die by the sword." In December, a three-judge panel of the U.S. Court of Appeals rejected the defendants' appeal, which contended that the government had masterminded the conspiracy.

== Imprisonment ==
For twelve of his 32 years in prison, López Rivera was held in solitary confinement in maximum security prisons. After spending twelve years in maximum security prisons in Marion, Illinois, and Florence, Colorado, López Rivera was transferred to the general prison population at the federal correctional facility in Terre Haute, Indiana. His supporters have accused the U.S. Federal Bureau of Prisons of isolating López Rivera on the basis of his political beliefs.

Several international organizations called for López Rivera to be released from prison, including political, religious, and labor groups. Others advocating his release have included the governor of Puerto Rico Alejandro Garcia Padilla, both houses of the Legislative Assembly of Puerto Rico, and Puerto Rican churches and professional organizations. South African archbishop Desmond Tutu described the charges against López Rivera as "conspiring to free his people from the shackles of imperial injustice". Luis Nieves Falcón, a social science professor at the University of Puerto Rico, Río Piedras Campus, has said that López Rivera is "among the longest held political prisoners in the history of Puerto Rico and in the world." His supporters have often compared his imprisonment to that of Nelson Mandela.

In 2006, a special committee of the United Nations called for the release from United States prisons of all convicted for actions related to Puerto Rican independence who had served more than 25 years, whom it termed "political prisoners".

Cases involving the release of other Puerto Rican nationalist prisoners have been categorized by some as cases of political prisoners, with some being more vocal than others.

== 1999 conditional clemency offer ==
On August 11, 1999, U.S. President Bill Clinton offered clemency to López Rivera and 15 other convicted FALN members, subject to the condition of "renouncing the use or threatened use of violence for any purpose" in writing. Some had fines reduced to the amounts they already paid and others had their sentences reduced to time already served. Two had their sentences reduced but would still have time to serve, including López-Rivera, whose seventy-year sentence would be reduced to about 44 and a half years, allowing him to leave prison in December 2025. None of those offered clemency were directly involved in FALN bombings that resulted in deaths and injuries; however, López-Rivera specifically was not offered clemency for his conviction for conspiracy to escape, to transport explosives with intent to kill and injure people, and to destroy government buildings and property, and aid in arson.

In offering clemency, White House spokesman said the: "President feels they deserved to serve serious sentences for these crimes, but not sentences that were far out of proportion to the nature of the crimes they were convicted for." (Note: U.S. Government statistics showed the prisoners' sentences were "about six times longer" than sentences for murder offenses by the American population at large. (Note: The figures are based on Torres and Velazquez's calculations of a prison term averaging 5.4 years received by those convicted of murder compared to terms averaging 65.4 years given FALN members.)) President Jimmy Carter had pardoned other Puerto Rican Nationalists on three occasions, including four who wounded members of Congress in an attack on the U.S. House of Representatives in 1954 and one who plotted to assassinate Harry Truman in 1950. Fourteen of the sixteen accepted Clinton's conditions. Of those, some were no longer in prison, eleven were released on September 10, and one had five more years to serve in prison.

Clinton had been urged to grant clemency by Coretta Scott King; several religious leaders, including Archbishop Desmond Tutu, Cardinal John J. O'Connor of the Archdiocese of New York, the Right Rev. Paul Moore Jr., the retired bishop of the Episcopal Diocese of New York; and by such New York Democrats as Representatives Jose E. Serrano, Charles B. Rangel, Nydia M. Velazquez and Eliot L. Engel. In September, Congressman Luis Gutiérrez said that the charge of seditious conspiracy against the FALN was "a political charge", and Congressman John J. LaFalce said that it misrepresented López Rivera's "desire to have independence for Puerto Rico from the United States".

Gloria Quinones, an activist who had called for the release of Puerto Rican nationalists from prison, expressed disappointment with the terms: "This is an olive branch that the President has extended in the process of reconciliation between the United States and Puerto Rico, but it's a very scrawny one." She particularly objected to the requirement that the prisoners not associate with each other upon release. (Note: The requirement that the released prisoners not associate with one another was a routine parole board requirement, not a condition set by President Clinton.) On September 21, the Resident Commissioner of Puerto Rico, Carlos Romero Barceló, supported Clinton's offer and denounced López Rivera for refusing to renounce violence. He told a committee evaluating the pardons that the FALN had operated "by means of violence, threats and terror" and that all FALN members endorsed violence.

The clemency offer by President Clinton was opposed by bipartisan majorities in both houses of Congress, which passed a Joint Resolution condemning Clinton's action in mid-September. It passed the U.S. House of Representatives on a vote of 311–41) and U.S. Senate by a vote of 95–2. The Joint Resolution repeatedly labeled the 16 Clinton had offered conditional clemency as "terrorists". (Note: The Joint Resolution included these phrases: "militant terrorist organization", "the 16 terrorists", "these terrorists", "these 16 terrorists", "offer of clemency to the FALN terrorists".) On September 21, 1999, a congressional hearing was held by the House Committee on Government Reform under the leadership of US representative Dan Burton on President Clinton's decision to offer clemency to members of the FALN; the report on the meeting was highly critical of the clemency offer, and titled "Clemency for the FALN: a flawed decision?".

Some Republicans said it showed President Clinton was trying to build support in New York's Puerto Rican community for his wife's campaign for the U.S. Senate in 2000. New York City Mayor Rudolph Giuliani said: "All of a sudden this president grants clemency, and does it on conditions. And he's a president who wants to make a stand against terrorism, so it raises very legitimate questions."

López Rivera's continued imprisonment was opposed by parts of the Puerto Rican community in the United States and elsewhere.

Several members of Congress called for his release, including Alan Grayson, Jose Serrano, and Luis Gutiérrez. Resident Commissioner Pedro Pierluisi did so as well.

His release had been demanded by 10 Nobel Peace Prize winners, Coretta Scott King, President Jimmy Carter, Archbishop Desmond Tutu, Senator Bernie Sanders as well as an international coalition of human rights, and religious, labor, and business leaders including the United Council of Churches of Christ, United Methodist Church, Baptist Peace Fellowship, Episcopal Church of Puerto Rico, and the Catholic Archbishop of San Juan.

López Rivera ultimately rejected the offer, allegedly because not all imprisoned FALN members had been pardoned and because it would have required him to serve another 10 years in prison. His sister, Zenaida López, said he refused the offer because on parole, he would be in "prison outside prison." Resident Commissioner Pedro Pierluisi said that López Rivera's "primary reason" was that similar clemency had not been offered to Carlos Torres. (Note: Torres was released from prison in July 2010.) López Rivera later explained, "When I was in Vietnam I never left anyone behind. That’s not my practice, I couldn’t do it".

== 2017 commutation and release ==
On January 17, 2017, President Barack Obama commuted López Rivera's sentence. His release was scheduled for May 17. On February 9, 2017, he was released from the Terre Haute prison and moved to Puerto Rico to serve the last three months of his sentence under house arrest. San Juan Mayor Carmen Yulín Cruz, one of the Puerto Rico politicians accompanying Lopez Rivera to Puerto Rico, said that she planned to give Lopez Rivera a job in her administration. According to U.S. Rep. Luis Gutierrez, the release to Puerto Rico came as a surprise to many, as "most prisoners go to halfway houses, [but] he got to go home to be with his daughter". López Rivera is currently living with his daughter at their home in San Juan.

Obama's decision to commute López Rivera's sentence was criticized by the columnists Charles Krauthammer and Charles Lane. On January 20, 2017, the Wall Street Journal published an op-ed by Joe Connor, the son of one of the victims of the Fraunces Tavern bombing, condemning Obama's decision to commute López Rivera's sentence.

Rivera was released from federal custody on May 17, 2017, after spending 36 years in prison.

== Works ==
- Oscar López Rivera, Entre la Tortura y la Resistencia, edited by Luis Nieves Falcón, 2011, a collection of letters
- López Rivera, Oscar (2013). Oscar López Rivera: Between Torture and Resistance. PM Press. ISBN 978-1-60486-833-3.

== See also ==
- List of people pardoned or granted clemency by the president of the United States
