= Juan Enrique Segarra-Palmer =

Puerto Rican activist (born 1950)

Juan Enrique Segarra-Palmer is a Puerto Rican activist and one of the founders of the pro-independence group Los Macheteros.

In 1989, he was convicted of seditious conspiracy, as well as interference with interstate commerce in connection with the Wells Fargo Depot robbery, which netted more than US$7 million (equivalent to more than $22.6 million in 2025). He was sentenced to 55 years in prison, but in 1999 accepted an offer of clemency from US President Bill Clinton.

== Early years and personal life ==
Segarra was born on March 6, 1950, in Santurce, Puerto Rico. He came from a nationalist family that had a long history of resistance to both Spanish and American colonialism. He worked in poor neighborhoods of New York, in prisons in Boston, in anti-mining campaigns and the land reclamation movement in Puerto Rico.

After attending Phillips Academy Andover, he graduated from Harvard University and continued studying in Cuernavaca, Mexico. He is married to former domestic terrorist Lucy Berrios and they have five children: Amilcar, Ramon, Wanda, Luriza, and Zulena.

== Seditious conspiracy ==
In 1985, Segarra was arrested for conspiring to overthrow the U.S. government in Puerto Rico and to obtain money from Wells Fargo company, which was insured by the United States government, to fund the independence struggle in Puerto Rico. He was sentenced to 60 years in prison in Atlanta, Georgia.

During his trial proceedings, Segarra declared himself a prisoner of war and refused to participate in the proceedings.

== Political activism ==
The Wells Fargo Depot robbery took place on September 12, 1983, coinciding with the birthdate of Puerto Rican nationalist Dr. Pedro Albizu Campos. The robbery occurred in West Hartford, Connecticut and resulted in a net gain of more than US$7 million (equivalent to more than $22.6 million in 2025). It was "then the largest cash heist in U.S. history." The Wells Fargo robbery incident resulted in no deaths or injuries.

The Macheteros gave the robbery the code name "White Eagle" (or Águila Blanca in Spanish). According to the Macheteros, part of the money was used to support impoverished communities in Puerto Rico by funding education, food, housing, clothing, and even toys for children. However, prosecutors argued that the money was actually used to finance the activities of Los Macheteros.

== Charges ==
The FBI charges against Segarra-Palmer for this robbery include: obstruction of commerce by robbery and conspiracy, bank robbery, aggravated robbery, theft from interstate shipment, foreign and interstate transportation of stolen money, and conspiracy to interfere with commerce by robbery. The group asserted that the money was not used for personal gain, but to further the struggle for Puerto Rico's independence.

Several Puerto Rican nationalists were sentenced to as long as 90 years in federal prisons for various offenses, including sedition, possession of unregistered firearms, interstate transportation of a stolen vehicle, interference with interstate commerce by violence, and interstate transportation of firearms with intent to commit a crime.

The individuals who were granted clemency were not convicted of any actual bombings but were convicted of such felonious charges as bomb making, conspiracy, armed robbery, and firearms violations. All of them were convicted of sedition, which refers to the act of attempting to overthrow the Government of the United States in Puerto Rico by force.

== Sentence ==
Juan Segarra-Palmer, one of the leaders of the group, was sentenced to 55 years in prison.

== Clemency ==
At the time of his arrest, Segarra-Palmer and the others declared themselves to be combatants in an anti-colonial war against the United States to liberate Puerto Rico from U.S. domination and invoked prisoner of war status. They argued that the U.S. courts did not have jurisdiction to try them as criminals and petitioned for their cases to be handed over to an international court that would determine their status. The U.S. Government, however, did not recognize their request.

The sentences received by Segarra-Palmer and the other Nationalists were judged to be "out of proportion to the nationalists' offenses." Statistics showed their sentences were almost 20 times greater than sentences for similar offenses by the American population at large.

For many years, certain national and international organizations criticized Segarra-Palmer's incarceration, categorizing it as political imprisonment. President Bill Clinton extended him conditional clemency, which he accepted. He was released in 2004.

In 2006, the United Nations called for the release of the remaining Puerto Rican political prisoners in United States prisons.

== See also ==
- Puerto Rican independence movement
