= International court =

Courts established by international agreements

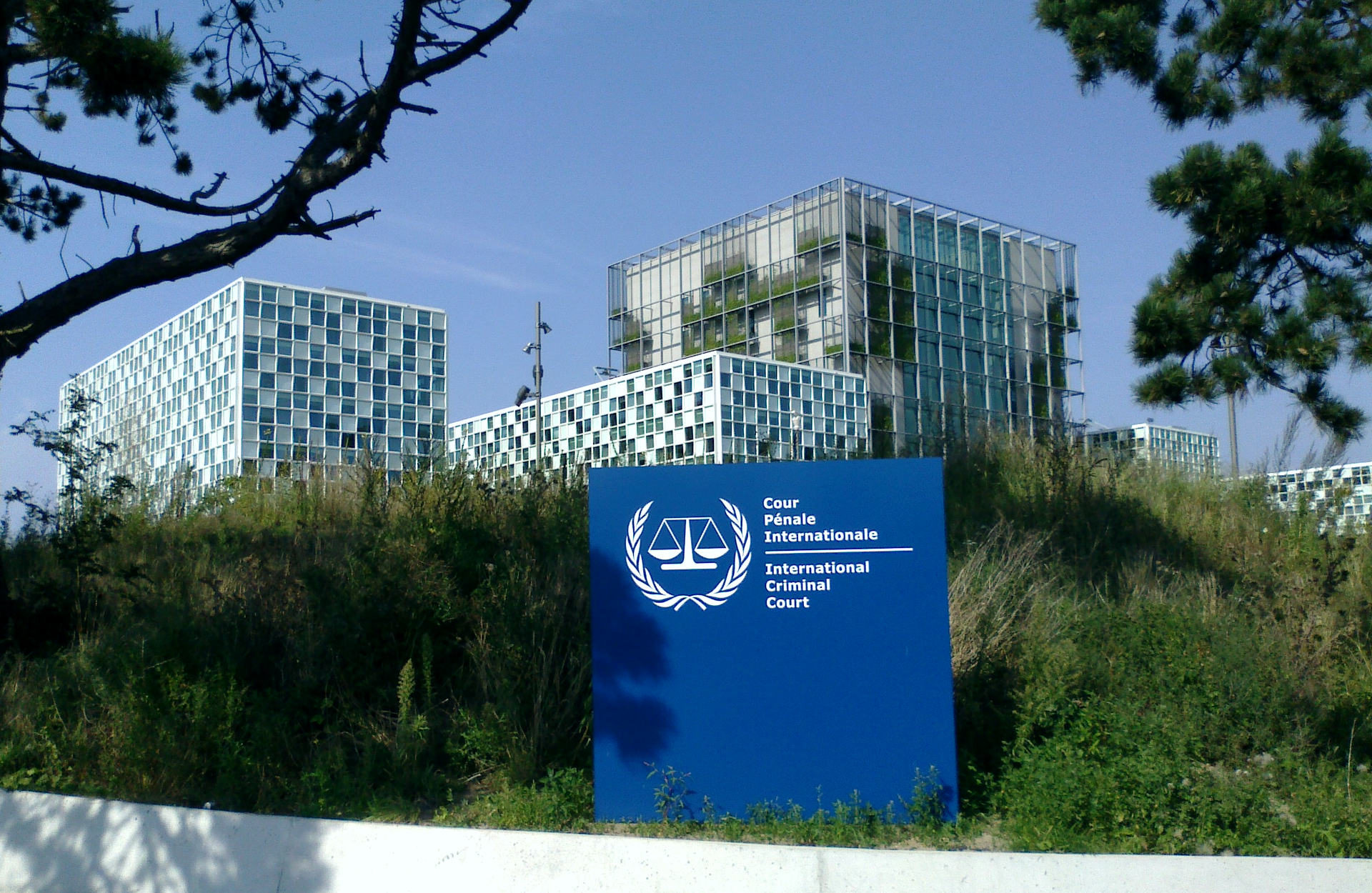
The International Criminal Court in The Hague

International courts are formed by treaties between nations, or by an international organization such as the United Nations – and include ad hoc tribunals and permanent institutions but exclude any courts arising purely under national authority.

== Definition ==
An international court is an international organization, or a body of an international organization, that hears cases in which one party may be a state or international organization (or body thereof), and which is composed of independent judges who follow predetermined rules of procedure to issue binding decisions on the basis of international law.

== History ==
Early examples of international courts were the Permanent International Court Of Justice (PCIJ) established by the League Of Nations for inter-state disputes as well as the League Of Nations Administrative Tribunal (LNAT) for staff disputes. After World War II the victorious countries set up the Nuremberg and Tokyo tribunals to penalize German and Japanese civil and military personnel. Several such international courts are presently located in The Hague in the Netherlands, most importantly the International Court of Justice (ICJ), and the International Criminal Court (ICC). Further international courts exist elsewhere, usually with their jurisdiction restricted to a particular country, a global or regional intergovernmental or supranational organization, or historic issue, such as the International Criminal Tribunal for Rwanda that deals with the genocide in Rwanda. A säpecial branch of the international judiciary are the administrative tribunals and appeals boards set up by international organisations such as the UN, World Bank, ILO and many others which rule on staff disputes.

In addition to international tribunals created to address crimes committed during genocides and civil war, ad hoc courts and tribunals combining international and domestic strategies have also been established on a situational basis. Examples of these "hybrid tribunals" are the Special Court for Sierra Leone, Special Tribunal for Lebanon, Special Panels of the Dili District Court in East Timor, and the Extraordinary Chambers in the Courts of Cambodia.

== Types of international courts ==
International courts has several types but the most common are two types:

- Ad-hoc courts: ex. the International Criminal Tribunal for the Former Yugoslavia (ICTY). This type of courts to be founded by the UN Security Council for a specific case then to be dissolved after its case.
- Permanent courts: ex. the International Criminal Court (ICC) and the International Court of Justice. This type of courts to be founded through historic development that framed by international treaty. And not necessary for an international permanent court to be part of the United Nations which is the case of the International Criminal Court (ICC).

== Privileges and immunities ==
Judges and high-level staff of such courts may be afforded diplomatic immunity if their governing authority allows.

== List of international courts ==
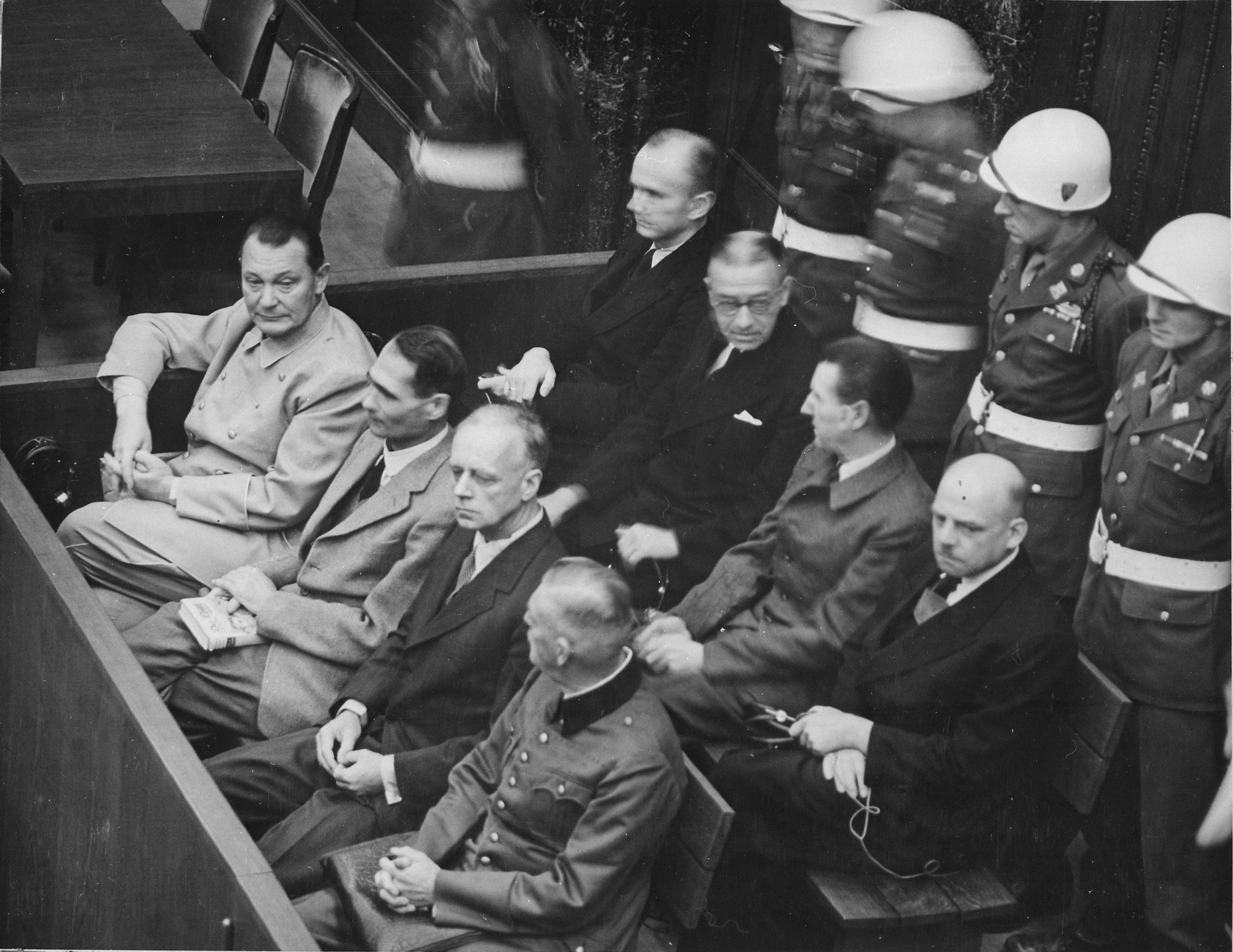
Defendants in the dock at the International Military Tribunal in Nuremberg

Name	Subject matter and scope	Headquarters	Years active
African Court on Human and Peoples' Rights	Human rights within the African Union	Addis Ababa, Ethiopia (2006–7); Arusha, Tanzania (2007–present)	2006–present
Appellate Body of the World Trade Organization	Trade disputes within the World Trade Organization	Geneva, Switzerland	1995–present
Benelux Court of Justice	Trade disputes within the Benelux	Brussels, Belgium	1975–present
Caribbean Court of Justice	General disputes within the Caribbean Community	Port of Spain, Trinidad and Tobago	2005–present
CIS Economic Court	Trade disputes and interpretation of treaties within the Commonwealth of Independent States	Minsk, Belarus	1994–present
COMESA Court of Justice	Trade disputes within the Common Market for Eastern and Southern Africa	Khartoum, Sudan	1998–present
Common Court of Justice and Arbitration of the OHADA	Interpretation of OHADA treaties and uniform laws	Abidjan, Ivory Coast	1998–present
Court of Justice of the Andean Community	Trade disputes within the Andean Community	Quito, Ecuador	1983–present
Court of the Eurasian Economic Union	Trade disputes and interpretation of treaties within the Eurasian Economic Union	Minsk, Belarus	2015–present
East African Court of Justice	Interpretation of East African Community treaties	Arusha, Tanzania	2001–present
Eastern Caribbean Supreme Court	General disputes within the Organisation of Eastern Caribbean States	Castries, Saint Lucia	1967–present
ECOWAS Court of Justice	Interpretation of Economic Community of West African States treaties	Abuja, Nigeria	1996–present
European Court of Human Rights	Human rights within the Council of Europe	Strasbourg, France	1959–present
European Court of Justice	Interpretation of European Union law	Luxembourg City, Luxembourg	1952–present
European Free Trade Association Court	Interpretation of European Free Trade Association law	Luxembourg City, Luxembourg	1994–present
European Nuclear Energy Tribunal	Nuclear energy disputes within the OECD	Paris, France	1960–present
Inter-American Court of Human Rights	Human rights within the Organization of American States	San José, Costa Rica	1979–present
International Court of Justice	General disputes globally (UN)	The Hague, Netherlands	1945–present
International Criminal Court	Criminal prosecutions globally (Rome Statute)	The Hague, Netherlands	2002–present
International Criminal Tribunal for Rwanda	Criminal prosecutions for the Rwandan genocide (UN)	Arusha, Tanzania	1994−2015
International Criminal Tribunal for the former Yugoslavia	Criminal prosecutions for the Yugoslav Wars (UN)	The Hague, Netherlands	1993−2017
International Military Tribunal	Criminal prosecutions of Nazi German officials for World War II/Holocaust (Nuremberg Charter)	Nuremberg, post-war Germany	1945–1946
International Military Tribunal for the Far East	Criminal prosecutions of Imperial Japanese officials for World War II (Tokyo Charter)	Tokyo, Japan	1946−1948
International Residual Mechanism for Criminal Tribunals	Completing the Rwanda and Yugoslav Tribunals' work (UN)	The Hague, Netherlands	2012−present
International Tribunal for the Law of the Sea	Maritime disputes globally (UNCLOS)	Hamburg, Germany	1994–present
Permanent Court of International Justice	General disputes globally (League of Nations)	The Hague, Netherlands	1922–1946
Residual Special Court for Sierra Leone	Completing the Special Court for Sierra Leone's work (UN)	Freetown, Sierra Leone	2013−present
SADC Tribunal	Interpretation of Southern African Development Community treaties	Windhoek, Namibia	2005–2012
Special Court for Sierra Leone	Criminal prosecutions for the Sierra Leone Civil War (UN)	Freetown, Sierra Leone	2002−2013
Special Tribunal for Lebanon	Criminal prosecutions for the assassination of Lebanese Prime Minister Rafic Hariri (UN)	Leidschendam, Netherlands	2009−2023

== List of hybrid tribunals ==
Name	Years active	Subject matter
Extraordinary African Chambers	2013–present	Criminal prosecutions for crimes against humanity committed during President Hissène Habré's tenure
Extraordinary Chambers in the Courts of Cambodia	2006–present	Criminal prosecutions of Khmer Rouge officials for the Cambodian genocide
Kosovo Specialist Chambers	2017–present	Criminal prosecutions of Kosovo Liberation Army officials for war crimes during the Kosovo War
Residual Special Court for Sierra Leone	2013−present	Criminal prosecutions for war crimes during the Sierra Leone Civil War
Special Court for Sierra Leone	2002–2013	Criminal prosecutions for war crimes during the Sierra Leone Civil War
Special Panels of the Dili District Court	2000–2006	Criminal prosecutions for war crimes during the 1999 East Timorese crisis
Special Tribunal for Lebanon	2009−2023	Criminal prosecutions for the assassination of Lebanese Prime Minister Rafic Hariri
Special Tribunal for the Crime of Aggression against Ukraine	2025−present	Criminal prosecutions for the crime of aggression against Ukraine

== Lectures ==
- Lecture by Yuval Shany (Yuval Shany) entitled Assessing the Effectiveness of International Courts: A Goal-based Approach in the Lecture Series of the United Nations Audiovisual Library of International Law
- Lecture by Sir Elihu Lauterpacht entitled The Role of the International Judge in the Lecture Series of the United Nations Audiovisual Library of International Law
- Lecture by Kenneth Keith entitled Aspects of the Judicial Process in National and International Courts and Tribunals in the Lecture Series of the United Nations Audiovisual Library of International Law
- Lecture by Mark Weston Janis entitled Protestants, Progress and Peace: the 19th Century Movement for an International Court and Congress: Early Drafts of Today's International Court and the United Nations in the Lecture Series of the United Nations Audiovisual Library of International Law

== See also ==
- International Anti-Corruption Court, proposed
- Judicial interpretation

== Literature ==
Hans-Joachim Priess, Internationale Verwaltungsgerichte und Beschwerdeausschüsse. EIne Studie zum gerichtlichen Rechtsschutz für Beamte internationaler Organisationen (veröffentlichungen des Instituts für Internationales Recht an der Universität Kiel Bd. 107, Verlag Duncker & Humblot, Berlin 1989 ISBN 3-428-06798-3
