= Fuerzas Armadas de Liberación Nacional Puertorriqueña =

Puerto Rican nationalist paramilitary organization

- Leader: Filiberto Ojeda Ríos †
- Dates active: 1960–1983
- Active regions: United States
- Ideology: Marxism-Leninism; Puerto Rican independence Nationalism; Anticolonialism; Anti-imperialism
- Political position: Far-left
- Wars: Puerto Rican independence movement

The Fuerzas Armadas de Liberación Nacional (English: Armed Forces of National Liberation, FALN) was a Puerto Rican clandestine paramilitary organization that, through direct action, advocated independence for Puerto Rico. It carried out more than 130 bomb attacks in the United States between 1974 and 1983, including a 1975 bombing of the Fraunces Tavern in New York City that killed four people.

The FALN served as the predecessor of the Boricua Popular Army. Several of the organization's members were arrested and convicted for seditious conspiracy, conspiracy to commit robbery and for firearms and explosives violations. On August 11, 1999 United States President Bill Clinton offered clemency to sixteen of the convicted militants under the condition that they renounce any kind of violent manifestation. This decision drew criticism towards the Clinton administration from figures including the Office of the United States Attorney, the FBI, and the United States Congress.

== Philosophy ==
The group was a 1970s Marxist–Leninist militant group which fought to transform Puerto Rico into a socialist-communist form of government.

== History ==
The Fuerzas Armadas de Liberación Nacional was founded in the 1960s. It was one of several organizations established during that decade that promoted "clandestine armed struggles" against the United States government that the movement described as the "colonial forces of the United States". The group was founded following decades of repression by the United States government, including illegal imprisonments and assassination against members of the Puerto Rican independence movement. The group was part of a movement that included other clandestine organizations, including the Movimiento Independentista Revolucionario Armado, Organización de Voluntarios por la Revolución Puertorriqueña and Los Comandos Armados de Liberación, and served as predecessor for what would become the Boricua Popular Army. The organization's intention was to draw attention to what they described as the "colonial condition" of Puerto Rico through armed action against the United States government and military.

The modus operandi of the FALN was to perform bombing and incendiary actions and then admit responsibility through press releases. The first of these news releases announced the group's intention; in this document they admitted responsibility for attacks on several locations in New York to weaken the "Yanki capitalist monopoly", and demanded the release of five political prisoners, these were: Lolita Lebrón, Oscar Collazo, Rafael Cancel Miranda, Andres Figueroa, and Irvin Flores. In this communique, the organization warns that they had opened two fronts, in Puerto Rico and the United States respectively, the goal of which were to organize a People's Revolutionary Army which they expected would "rid Puerto Rico of Yanki colonialism". Both fronts were supported and maintained by allies within Puerto Rico and the United States.

=== FALN pardons of 1999 ===
On August 11, 1999, U.S. President Bill Clinton offered clemency to sixteen members of the FALN convicted for seditious conspiracy, conspiracy to commit robbery, and conspiracy to bomb-making, as well as for firearms and explosives violations. None of the sixteen were convicted of bombings or any crime which injured another person, and all of the sixteen had served nineteen years or longer in prison which, according to the White House, were longer sentences than such crimes typically received. President Clinton offered the clemency at the appeal of 10 Nobel Peace Prize laureates, President Jimmy Carter, the Archbishop of New York, and the Archbishop of Puerto Rico, and it was conditional on prisoners renouncing violence. The commutation was opposed by U.S. Attorney's Office, the FBI, and the Federal Bureau of Prisons and criticized by many including former victims of FALN terrorist activities, the Fraternal Order of Police, and members of Congress. Hillary Clinton in her campaign for Senator also criticized the commutation, although she had earlier been supportive. FALN prisoner Oscar López Rivera rejected the 1999 Clinton pardon. U.S. president Barack Obama later commuted his sentence, and López Rivera was released in May 2017 after 36 years in prison. He had been incarcerated longer than any other member of the FALN.

== Major incidents ==
Date	Description	Reference(s)
October 26, 1974	NYC FALN's 5 bombs in Manhattan	
June 4, 1977	FALN set off a bomb on the fifth floor of the Cook County Building in Chicago. The explosion occurred near the offices of Acting Mayor Michael Bilandic and of George Dunne, the president of the Cook County Board of Commissioners. It was Saturday, and no one was in either office. Although 250 election judges were attending a meeting on the fourth floor no one was harmed.	
March 15, 1980	Armed members of FALN raided the campaign headquarters of Carter-Mondale in Chicago and the campaign headquarters of George H. W. Bush in New York City. Seven people in Chicago and ten people in New York were tied up as the offices were vandalized before the FALN members fled. A few days later, Carter delegates in Chicago received threatening letters from FALN. On April 5, 11 members of FALN were arrested for attempting to rob an armored truck at Northwestern University; three were linked to the raid on the Carter-Mondale campaign headquarters.	

== See also ==
- Boricua Popular Army
- General Intelligence Directorate
- List of people pardoned or granted clemency by the president of the United States
