= Armed Forces of Popular Resistance =

Puerto Rican paramilitary group

- Fuerzas Armadas de Resistencia Popular
- Leader: Federico Cintrón Fiallo
- Dates active: 1977–1986
- Merged into: Boricua Popular Army
- Active regions: Puerto Rico
- Ideology: Puerto Rican independence Marxism-Leninism
- Part of: National Revolutionary Command

The Armed Forces of Popular Resistance (Spanish: Fuerzas Armadas de Resistencia Popular, abbreviated FARP) was a Marxist-Leninist Puerto Rican nationalist paramilitary group active in Puerto Rico from 1977 to 1986. It was believed to be linked to the Workers' Socialist Movement (MST) and was led by Federico Cintrón Fiallo.

The FARP was formed from the "La Orga" group of pro-independence activists, which had been active in the nationalist movement since the late 1960s. It considered itself to be a political-military organization and waged a paramilitary campaign against United States rule in Puerto Rico. To this end, it carried out a series of bombings, bank robberies, shootings, and armed takeovers. It was a member of the allegedly Cuban-backed National Revolutionary Command (CRN) coalition, but would later withdraw due to disputes with other members of the alliance. The group often collaborated with the EPB-Macheteros, the Armed Forces of National Liberation (FALN), and the Organization of Volunteers for the Puerto Rican Revolution (OVRP), notably taking part in the Sabana Seca ambush.

After a campaign lasting 9 years, FARP carried out its last attack, a series of bombings, on 28 October 1986 in conjunction with the EPB-Macheteros and OVRP. After this attack, the FARP dissolved and some of its members were believed to have joined the Macheteros.

== History ==
=== Early actions ===
According to the FARP leader Federico Cintrón Fiallo, what would become the FARP began organizing in 1968 out of the broader Puerto Rican independence movement. Its members were drawn from the Pro-Independence Movement (MPI, later the Puerto Rican Socialist Party) who organized themselves informally as "La Orga". However, armed activities would not begin until 1977.

On 16 February 1977, a group of militants believed to be members of FARP and the EPB-Macheteros robbed a Banco de Ponce branch in Arroyo, making off with $93,656. During the robbery, a police officer and a bank guard were disarmed. The pistol taken from the policeman was later discovered in the possession of an alleged FARP member and associate of the MST. At the end of 1977, the Electrical Industry and Irrigation Workers Union (UTIER) initiated a strike, which gained the support of the pro-independence paramilitary groups. This led to the public emergence of the FARP, who used its attacks to support the strike.

On 31 January 1978, four members of the FARP raided a police station in Manatí. Two policemen were tied up and robbed of their weapons and uniforms and militants destroyed equipment in the station. The militants then spray painted slogans supporting the UTIER strike as well as the FARP acronym. This was the first time the FARP had publicly revealed itself. Four days later, on 4 February, one of the suspected participants in the Manatí attack, Guillermo Romery Santa, was shot dead in his home, allegedly by an EPB-Macheteros member. Media reported that the killing of Romery Santa was related to a personal dispute, but it may have also stemmed from a paramilitary feud. On 22 June, FARP militants robbed a Caguas Federal Savings Bank in Guaynabo, stealing $60,000. On 26 October, FARP held up the Game and Target Shop in Hato Rey and stole 25 firearms. The FARP acronym was spray painted on a wall as the militants escaped.

After the Hato Rey raid, the FARP was inactive for several months. It re-emerged on 12 September 1979 when its members robbed a Wells Fargo armored car outside of a Banco de Ponce branch in Vega Baja, stealing $734,000. The date was symbolic as it was the birthday of nationalist leader Pedro Albizu Campos. Immediately prior to the assault, the militants had created two roadblocks to aid in their escape. Police units responding to the scene were able to capture and arrest three participants in the robbery after witnesses identified them.

=== Involvement in the National Revolutionary Command ===
Sometime in September 1979, a meeting was held between the leaderships of the major nationalist paramilitary groups, allegedly at the behest of Cuba. The meeting established a joint command structure among the five most important groups: the FARP, the EPB-Macheteros, the FALN, the OVRP, and the People's Revolutionary Commandos (CRP), which would come to be known as the National Revolutionary Command (CRN). A communique was released on 22 September 1979 by all five organizations announcing that they were working together. A little over a week later on 2 October, FARP raided the La Hacienda bar in Ceiba, which was located across from Roosevelt Roads Naval Station. Five members of the group held ten United States Navy personnel and civilian workers at gunpoint, warning them against bombing Vieques Island. The militants then set the bar on fire and fled.

The first joint attack carried out by the CRN occurred on 17 October, with every group besides the CRP participating. Two bombs exploded at government targets in Chicago while four more exploded at a Coast Guard tower, a US Customs building, a statue commemorating the Spanish-American War, and a radar communications system at Ramey Air Force Base in Puerto Rico. An additional two bombs were also discovered that had not exploded. The attack was jointly claimed by the FALN, EPB-Macheteros, FARP, and OVRP. Almost two months later, the FARP carried out its most infamous attack jointly with the EPB-Macheteros and OVRP. On 3 December 1979, militants ambushed a Navy bus in Sabana Seca, killing two sailors and wounding ten. The attack was claimed as a joint operation in retaliation for the death of a nationalist activist in prison.

On 25 October 1980, the FARP bombed a floral shop in Hato Rey owned by a member of the Coordination of United Revolutionary Organizations, a Cuban anti-Castro paramilitary group that was involved in attacks against the independence movement. On 14 November, FARP left an improvised explosive device at Fort Allen. The device was discovered and dismantled. A few months later on 15 March 1981, FARP left a car bomb at the Convention Center in Condado, where Henry Kissinger was set to speak. The bomb failed to explode, but set the car on fire.

=== Activities after leaving the CRN ===
Sometime in 1981, the FARP left the CRN due to disagreements with the EPB-Macheteros. The attack at the Condado Convention Center would be the last attack the group carried out in 1981. Their next attack would take place over a year later, on 10 June 1982. Two bombs exploded at the Marbella Condominium in Carolina, one of which destroyed a Puerto Rico Electric Power Authority transformer. A third bomb that was left failed to explode. After this attack, the FARP would fall silent. This was partially the result of the jailing of Cintrón Fiallo and an associate for contempt of court in relation to a grand jury investigation into the FALN. Cintrón Fiallo would be imprisoned from 1984 to 1985, when a judge ordered his release.

Following Cintrón Fiallo's release, what remained of the FARP would carry out one last attack in concert with the EPB-Macheteros and OVRP. On 28 October 1986, ten bombs were placed at targets across Puerto Rico, but only two exploded: one at the US Navy Recruiting Station in Fajardo, injuring one person, and one placed on a United States Army truck at Fort Buchanan. Sometime after this attack took place, the FARP dissolved and some of its former members reportedly joined the Macheteros.

== Structure ==
According to Cintrón Fiallo, the FARP was structured as a "political-military" organization, meaning there was no distinction between the political and armed wings of the organization. Despite this, some sources reported that the group was linked to the Workers' Socialist Movement and its predecessor, the Popular Socialist Movement.

The FARP published a journal called Urayoán, named after the Taíno chief of the same name. It featured political commentary and a section titled "Preparación Militar" that provided firearms and explosives instructions. The FARP also published the journals El Combatiente, Publicaciones Resistencia and 6 de Febrero.

== See also ==
- Boricua Popular Army
- Sabana Seca ambush
- Fuerzas Armadas de Liberación Nacional Puertorriqueña
