= Cep (disambiguation) =

Cep, also called porcino or Boletus edulis, is an edible mushroom.

Cep or CEP may also refer to:

== Organizations ==
- Campaign for an English Parliament
- Centre d'Expérimentations Nucléaires du Pacifique, French operation of nuclear testing in the Pacific between 1963 and 1996
- Centre for Economic Performance, at the London School of Economics
- Centre for European Policy, a European think tank
- Civic Education Project, promoting pluralism
- Clean Energy Partnership, for hydrogen power in Europe
- Clean Energy Project, for solar cells, Harvard University
- Communications, Energy and Paperworkers Union of Canada
- Congregation for the Evangelization of Peoples, a dicastery of the Roman Curia
- Corpo Expedicionário Português or Portuguese Expeditionary Corps, military formation during the First World War
- Counter Extremism Project

== Science and technology ==
- Carrier-envelope phase, of a laser pulse
- Cep, abbreviation for the constellation Cepheus
- Circular error probable, of weapon precision
- Complex event processing, of real-time events
- Congenital erythropoietic porphyria or Gunther disease
- British Rail Class 411, or 4 Cep, trains
- Lactocepin, an enzyme

== Other uses ==
- Cep (Jindřichův Hradec District), a village in the Czech Republic
- Código de Endereçamento Postal, the Brazilian postal code system
- CEP, a musical project by American musician Caroline Polachek
