= PRTP =

PRTP may refer to:

- Puerto Rican Workers' Revolutionary Party, a Puerto Rican political party
- Lactocepin, an enzyme
