= Querido FBI =

2005 song by Calle 13

Single by Calle 13
- Released: September 27, 2005
- Genre: Urban; rap
- Length: 3:33
- Label: White Lion

Calle 13 singles chronology
"Querido FBI" (2005)	"Se Vale To-To" (2005)

"Querido FBI" (English: "Dear FBI") is a song from Puerto Rican urban group Calle 13. The song was recorded in September, 2005 and released through the Internet about 30 hours after the death of Puerto Rican Revolutionary leader Filiberto Ojeda Ríos in what appeared to be a botched raid at his house.

== Background, recording and release ==
While Calle 13 was in the middle of the recording of their first album, Filiberto, who was the leader of the Puerto Rican Revolutionary group known as Los Macheteros was killed during a raid at his house led by the FBI, on September 23, 2005. Ojeda Ríos was deemed a fugitive by the FBI (he had been hiding at various places in Puerto Rico over a period that lasted exactly 15 years) for refusing to submit himself to justice on charges issued in absentia after a bank robbery in Hartford, Connecticut for which he was labeled as a conspirator. The raid's timing (which coincided with the anniversary of the Grito de Lares, the most successful event ever related with the Puerto Rican independence movement), led a considerable amount of the Puerto Rican populace to speculate that the event had the dual purpose of killing Ojeda and giving the pro-independence movement in Puerto Rico an exemplary punishment.

Angered by the FBI's action, Residente (singer of Calle 13) wrote a song about what happened and asked his record label, White Lion, to allow them to release the single about thirty hours after Ojeda's killing, to the public via the Internet through viral marketing through Indymedia Puerto Rico, an alternative news website. The song was co-produced by local DJ Danny Fornaris.

== Musical structure ==
The song opens with an attention call addressed to people of all social backgrounds in Puerto Rico. Residente then describes his considerable anger against what had happened to Ojeda, and how that represents a humiliation to Puerto Ricans ("(A) nuestra bandera la han llena'o de mea'o", meaning "Our flag has been pissed upon") It also shows the political concerns of Calle 13, as evidenced by their allusions to 9/11, the U.S. government's involvement in the Ponce massacre.

The song suggests putting an end to U.S. military and federal-police intervention in Puerto Rico by involving the entire Commonwealth of Puerto Rico, but particularly public housing dwellers, those residing in "caseríos" who normally battle each other on urban skirmishes related with crime, but who also happen to have federal law enforcement officials as a common enemy.

The duo was criticized by some who believed the lyrics promoted violence against U.S. authorities (such as "hoy me disfrazo de machetero / y esta noche voy a ahorcar a diez marineros" ("Today I'll dress up as a machetero / and tonight I'll hang ten sailors") Also, "Y por eso protesto (...) Y hasta por un septiembre 11." (And therefore I protest (....) and even for a September 11." Calle 13 stated that the song was not meant to be taken literally and merely symbolized his frustration with Ojeda's killing.

The lyrics also include the phrase "Sin cojones la radio y las ventas, White Lion me dio pasaporte para tirar este corte" ("Bollocks about radio and album sales, White Lion gave me a passport [permission] to throw [publish] this cut"), evidencing Residente's wish to have the song distributed for free with permission from the label.

== Music video ==
Eventually, a video clip for the song surfaced, which combines images from Ojeda himself, his burial, scenes from historical footage from the 1954 armed attack to the United States House of Representatives by Puerto Rican nationalists, and images of everyday Puerto Ricans holding protest signs. Spanish-Puerto Rican thrash metal band "Juerguistas y Borrachos" also issued a remix of the song, adding electric guitar riffs to it. Both media items were also released to the public through viral marketing.

== Impact ==
Public controversy about the song's lyrics ensured immediate attention from mainstream media in Puerto Rico and gave the band instant rise to local fame. The song, according to critics, "redefined what a reggaeton vocalist's relationship to Puerto Rico should be." Up to that moment, most local reggaetón artists had opted not to address political subjects in their songs. In comparison, "Querido FBI" became the subject of debate at a forum hosted at University of Puerto Rico at Rio Piedras soon after its release, and had its lyrics posted in local newspapers such as Primera Hora and Claridad. Although the song mentions the prospect of revenge for Ojeda's death, the duo asserts that the song was not intended to endorse violence.

== See also ==
- Filiberto Ojeda Ríos
- Independence movement in Puerto Rico
