= 1979 Sabana Seca ambush =

Attack on US Navy sailors in Puerto Rico

- Part of the Puerto Rican independence movement
Date	3 December 1979
Location	Sabana Seca, Puerto Rico 18°26′43″N 66°11′58″W
Result	National Revolutionary Command victory

Belligerents
National Revolutionary Command: EPB-Macheteros; FARP; OVRP	United States: United States Navy

Commanders and leaders
Juan Segarra-Palmer	CTRC Warren Smith (WIA)

Strength
At least 6 militants	18 sailors

Casualties and losses
None	2 killed 10 wounded

The 1979 Sabana Seca ambush was an attack by Puerto Rican nationalist paramilitary groups on a United States Navy bus near a listening post in Sabana Seca, Puerto Rico on 3 December 1979. The bus was carrying 18 unarmed sailors, most of whom were communications technicians. Three groups claimed responsibility for the ambush: the Boricua Popular Army (EPB, also known as 'Los Macheteros'), the Armed Forces of Popular Resistance (FARP), and the Organization of Volunteers for the Puerto Rican Revolution (OVRP). Two sailors were killed and another 10 were wounded.

== Background ==
Since the mid-1960s, paramilitary groups associated with the Puerto Rican independence movement had been carrying out attacks on American interests both on the island and within the continental US. Many of these groups were ideologically Marxist-Leninist and took inspiration from the Cuban Revolution For the most part, attacks targeted property and infrastructure, with some exceptions.

By 1973, the first generation of these groups were eliminated on the island, but the remnants united to form the Armed Forces of Puerto Rican National Liberation (FALN) within the continental US. The island-based groups re-emerged in 1976, with the founding of the EPB and its political wing, the Puerto Rican Workers Revolutionary Party. Several other clandestine paramilitary groups would also form around this time, such as the FARP and OVRP, both of which were linked to pro-independence political organizations. These groups began carrying out ambush attacks on police and the United States Armed Forces, starting with the shooting death of a Puerto Rico Police officer in Naguabo on 24 August 1978.

In September 1979, five nationalist paramilitaries joined together to form the National Revolutionary Command (CRN) operations room, allegedly with Cuban backing. The joint command included the EPB-Macheteros, FARP, and OVRP. The first attack in which several groups worked together occurred on 19 October 1979, when the FALN, EPB, FARP, and OVRP jointly bombed six targets in Puerto Rico and Chicago. On 11 November 1979, Puerto Rican independence activist and member of the Socialist League Angel Rodriguez Cristobal was found dead in prison in Florida, where he was serving a sentence related to protesting against the use of the island of Vieques by the US Navy. Authorities ruled his death a suicide, but supporters of independence considered it to be a political murder and vowed revenge.

== Ambush ==
At around 6:30 AM on 3 December 1979, a yellow Navy bus carrying 18 unarmed communications technicians left the US Navy base in Toa Baja to travel to the Sabana Seca communications station, taking Route 867. At around 6:40, when the bus was about a mile from the station, a green truck that had been tailing the bus suddenly accelerated and overtook it, stopping in front of the bus. This forced the driver, CTO1 John Ball, to brake and stop the bus. Suddenly, gunfire erupted from a white van that was parked to the left of the bus, lasting about 30 seconds. Militants fired some 47 shots with Kalashnikov rifles, M16 rifles, and Thompson submachine guns. Ball and another technician, RM3 Emil E. White, were killed while another 10 Navy personnel were injured. The militants in the pickup truck abandoned it and fled with the other gunmen in the white van, which was recovered several hours later in San Juan.

A communique issued by the EPB-Macheteros, OVRP, and FARP the next day claimed responsibility for the ambush, stating it was in retaliation for the death of Angel Rodriguez Cristobal as well as two pro-independence activists killed at Cerro Maravilla.

== Aftermath ==
The attack was condemned by both American and Puerto Rican politicians alike. President Jimmy Carter denounced the attacks as "a despicable act of murder", while governor of Puerto Rico Carlos Romero Barceló pledged to find the perpetrators. The pro-independence Puerto Rican Independence Party also condemned the attack, stating "it may serve to scare some people". In contrast, the Marxist-Leninist Puerto Rican Socialist Party blamed the actions of the US military for "provoking" the attack.

Security at military installations was increased following the ambush and Navy personnel were advised not to wear their uniforms outside of base. Two of the suspected participants in the attack were assassinated in 1980, allegedly by right-wing paramilitaries. In 2014, Juan Galloza Acevedo was sentenced to five years in prison for participating in the attack.
