= Calle 13 (album) =

Studio album by Calle 13
- Released: November 29, 2005
- Studio: Southern Recording Tracks (Atlanta, Georgia)
- Genre: Latin; hip hop; reggaeton
- Length: 48:46
- Language: Spanish
- Label: White Lion
- Producer: Eduardo Cabra

Calle 13 chronology
| Calle 13 (2005) | Residente o Visitante (2007) |

Singles from Calle 13
- 1. "Se Vale to-to" Released: 2005; 2. "Atrévete-te-te" Released: January 2006; 3. "Suave" Released: September 2006; 4. "La Jirafa" Released: 2006

Calle 13 is the debut studio album by Puerto Rican urban/hip hop band Calle 13, released on November 29, 2005, by White Lion Records. The album was recorded in the wake of the group's online success with the song "Querido FBI". The album received positive reviews, with critics praising Residente's lyrical style and the musical diversity displayed on the record.

The lead single "Atrévete-te-te" peaked at number 15 on the Billboard Hot Latin Songs chart and is now considered to be one of the group's signature songs. At the 2006 Latin Grammy Awards, Calle 13 won three Latin Grammy Awards including Best Urban Music Album, Best New Artist, and Best Short Form Music Video for their first single "Atrévete-te-te".

== Background and recording ==
Calle 13 was formed when step-brothers Residente (real name René Pérez Joglar) and Visitante (real name Eduardo José Cabra Martínez) began creating music together in 2004. Before forming the group, Residente obtained a master's degree in art from the Savannah College of Art and Design while Visitante had studied music at the University of Puerto Rico. Residente returned to Puerto Rico in 2003. The step-brothers hosted their music on a website, and began searching for a record label in order to release their music commercially.

After sending demo tapes to White Lion Records, the duo was offered a record deal. Residente chose White Lion due to his admiration for Tego Calderón, another artist on the label. White Lion president Elías de León explained that his cousin and A&R director Carlos "Karly" Rosario alerted him to the demo and stated, "These weird guys brought this demo. You've got to listen to it." Residente was working at his day job as a draftsman for an architectural firm when he received the call that Calle 13 had been signed. The group then recorded "Se Vale Tó-Tó" and released it as a single to the Puerto Rican radio station WVOZ (Mix 107), where it became a radio hit on the island. To promote the group locally, Residente directed and edited the video for "Se Vale Tó-Tó" with the help of his cousin, which was filmed on a relatively small budget of US$14,000.

The duo gained recognition for their song "Querido FBI", which responded to the killing of Filiberto Ojeda Ríos, a key figure for the Puerto Rican independence movement. Shortly after, the duo collaborated with Julio Voltio on the single "Chulin Culin Chunfly", which reached number eight on the Billboard Hot Latin Songs chart, creating more buzz for the group. After the success of "Querido F.B.I." and "Chulin Culin Chunfly", the duo headed to the studio to record its debut album. When creating music for the record, Residente explained, "I didn't care about anything. I had no commitments, I was relaxed." According to Residente, the lack of critical recognition and fame gave the rapper to express himself freely on the record. When composing songs for the album, Residente began by writing lyrics and Visitante then constructed his beats to complement the lyrical content.

== Composition ==
=== Music and lyrics ===
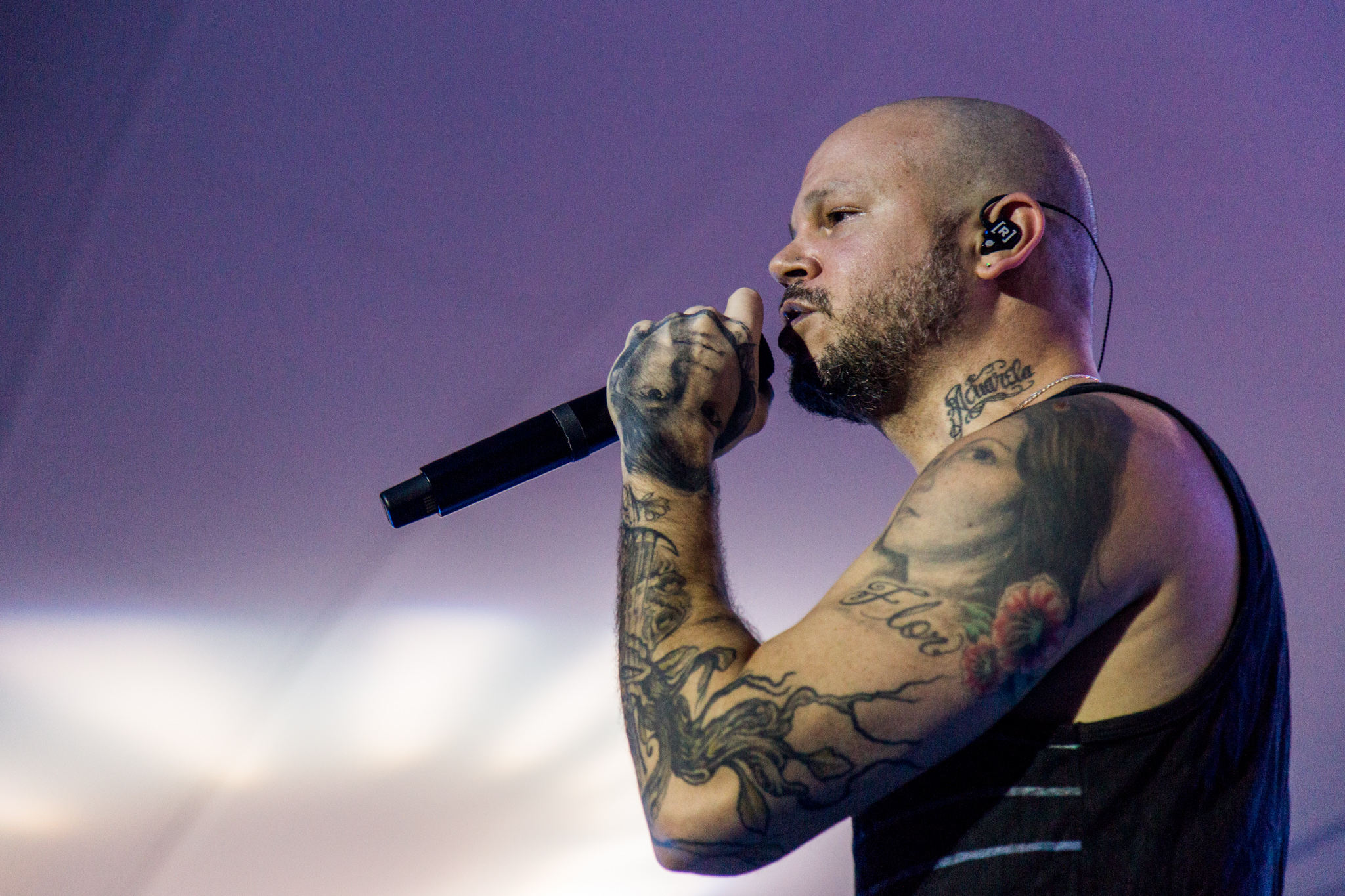
Residente (pictured) aimed to discuss a variety of subjects on the album and was praised for his unique lyricism.

The album was mostly known for its new sound in reggaeton, where most of the tracks were composed of different rhythms and lyrics, without use of the dem bow beat. The album is a blend of reggaeton and hip hop, all with a humorous and sarcastic feel to it in subject matter. Anthony Colombo of Billboard noted that the album contains influences "that range from formal conservatory training to street music, animation, and Dadaism". The album additionally contains elements of salsa, funk, and electronica. The record features live percussion throughout, and some songs contain cumbia-influenced instrumentation. With Calle 13, the group started to be labeled as reggaeton, a genre that the duo wished to distance itself from. Visitante commented on the situation: "The truth is that the first record had only four reggaetons. Those were the cuts used for promotional purposes, and so that’s the brand that was put on us. But from the beginning, to me, reggaeton never offered anything musically. My brother liked it, yes, but we always tried to execute it in an organic way, with real instruments and mixing it with other genres."

On the album, Residente wished to address a diverse array of subjects as opposed to simply discussing politics, which he felt would be "a bore". Residente's self-deprecating, crass, and sarcastic lyrical style garnered comparisons to American rapper Eminem. Nuria Net, managing editor at Fusion, described Residente's lyrical style by explaining, "Calle 13 rapped about the female body, the nalgas, the curves, the bodily fluids ... It was so much more graphic, and poetic, but even raunchier than reggaeton and urban music 10 years ago."

=== Songs ===
"La Aguacatona" contains musical allusions to George Gershwin's "Summertime". The songs "Atrévete-te-te", "Suave", and "Se Vale Tó-Tó" are considered to have a party atmosphere. "Se Vale Tó-Tó" contains sexual euphemisms, including the recurring phrase "anything goes in this sausage sandwich". The song's title is a play on words, substituting "to-to", a variation on the Puerto Rican slang term for a vagina ("toto"), for "todo" (all). An approximate translation of "se vale todo" is "all is allowed here" or, more accurately, "anything goes"; the song's chorus is a reference to grinding while dancing. The first interlude, "Intel-lú-Ayala", humorously discusses "residents" and "visitors" to Puerto Rico, using the stage names of the two band members to deride colonialism from Spain and the United States on the island.

"La Jirafa" contains Brazilian-influenced percussion and combined with the theme music from the 2001 French romantic comedy Amélie. Residente described "La Jirafa" as "a pretty song, a love song for a woman, but it’s about Puerto Rico too." Writing in his book Reggaeton, Raquel Z. Rivera describes "Atrévete-te-te" as "a call for liberation directed to anyone who listens, but above all to the Puerto Rican middle class, the so-called miss intellectual whose heady 'show' of racial and class superiority does not allow her to enjoy her body and dance down the hill with the rest of the reggaeton nation." The song "Pi-Di-Di-Di" mocks rapper P. Diddy, who had come to Puerto Rico earlier to scout out new musicians, and Residente felt that he was exploiting the island. "Sin Coro" pokes fun at "conscious" rappers who claim to be anti-commercial and then "going to the mall to buy a pair of Nikes".

== Reception ==
=== Commercial performance ===
Although the album was not a huge success on the Billboard 200, only peaking at number 189, it was a major success on the Billboard Top Latin Albums chart, peaking in the top 10 at number six. It was also a huge success on the Billboard Top Heatseekers chart, peaking at number three. The single "Atrévete-te-te" peaked at number 15 on the Billboard Hot Latin Songs chart and at number six on the US Latin Tropical Airplay chart. By the end of 2006, the album had sold more than 150,000 copies in the United States alone. Worldwide, the album sold 350,000 copies.

=== Critical response ===
Professional ratings
Review scores
| Source | Rating |
|---|---|
| AllMusic | 4/5 stars |

The album received positive reviews from critics, who praised Residente's unique lyricism and the group's musical diversity. Jason Birchmeier of Allmusic praised the album for its unique spin on reggaeton, noting that Residente's lyrics display a "healthy sense of humor and an almost clownish approach to sarcasm...a world apart from the kingly bravado of most reggaeton vocalists, and the obligatory glimmers of misogyny and violence that accompany such streetwise swaggering." He described Visitante's beats as "inventive", enjoying the record's deviation from reggaeton's "industry-standard trademark of Luny Tunes and that production team's assembly line of bandwagon-jumping imitators." Nate Chinen of The New York Times called Residente a "lean and literate rapper" and the album "an intelligent effort, and not just by reggaetón standards." Jasmine Garsd of National Public Radio praised Residente's lyrics, describing him as "foul-mouthed and self-deprecating, but undeniably talented" and "as funny as [he is] gross".

=== Awards ===
At the 2006 Latin Grammy Awards, Calle 13 won three Latin Grammy Awards including Best Urban Music Album, Best New Artist, and Best Short Form Music Video for their first single "Atrévete-te-te".

== Track listing ==
All music by "Perez, Rene; Cabra, Eduardo", except where otherwise noted

1. "Cabe-c-o" – 3:34
2. "Suave" (Smooth) – 3:34
3. "La Aguacatona" (featuring Voltio and PG-13) – 4:01
4. "Se Vale To-To" (Everything Allowed) – 3:51
5. "Intel-lú-Ayala" – 0:29
6. "Tengo Hambre" (I'm Hungry) – 4:05
7. "La Hormiga Brava" (The Brave Ant) (featuring PG-13) – 3:46
8. "La Jirafa" (The Giraffe) – 3:16
9. "Intel-lú la comermierda" – 0:24
10. "Atrévete-te-te" (Dare you-you-you) – 4:01
11. "Pi-Di-Di-Di" – 3:31
12. "Vamo Animal" (Let's Go Animal) (featuring Severo Canta Claro) (Severo Canta Claro Independiente/Perez, Rene/Cabra, Eduardo) – 3:27
13. "Eléctrico" (Electric) – 3:21
14. "Sin Coro" (Without a Chorus) (featuring Tuna Bardos) – 3:49
15. "La Tripleta" (The hat-trick) (featuring PG-13) – 3:21
16. "La Madre de los Enanos" (The Mother of the Dwarfs) – 4:02
17. "Suave (Blass Mix)" (Smooth (Blas Mix) – 3:40

== Charts ==
=== Weekly charts ===
Chart performance for Calle 13
| Chart (2005) | Peak position |
|---|---|
| US Top Latin Albums (Billboard) | 6 |
| Chart (2006–07) | Peak position |
| Argetinan Albums (CAPIF) | 12 |
| US Billboard 200 | 189 |
| US Heatseekers Albums (Billboard) | 3 |
| Venezuelan Albums (Recordland) | 11 |
| Chart (2014) | Peak position |
| Ecuadorian Albums (Musicalisimo) | 9 |

=== Year-end charts ===
Year-end chart performance for Calle 13
| Chart (2006) | Position |
|---|---|
| US Top Latin Albums (Billboard) | 15 |
| Chart (2007) | Position |
| US Top Latin Albums (Billboard) | 61 |

== Certifications ==
Certifications for Calle 13
| Region | Certification | Certified units/sales |
|---|---|---|
| United States (RIAA) | Platinum (Latin) | 100,000^{^} |
^{^} Shipments figures based on certification alone.
