= Antonio García López =

Antonio Garcia Lopez may refer to:

- Antonio García López (criminal), Puerto Rican criminal
- Antonio García López (artist), Spanish Realist painter
