= Farinacci (surname) =

Farinacci is an Italian surname. Notable people with the surname include:

- Alvaro Farinacci (born 1944), Canadian politician
- Béatrice Farinacci (born 1964), French figure skater
- Daniela Farinacci, Australian actress
- Dominick Farinacci (born 1983), American jazz trumpeter, composer, and big band leader
- John Farinacci, (born 2001), American ice hockey player
- Jorge Farinacci (1949–2006), Puerta Rican politician
- Prospero Farinacci (1554–1618), Italian lawyer and judge
- Roberto Farinacci (1892–1945), Italian politician
