= García López =

García López may refer to:

- García López de Cárdenas, Spanish conquistador
- Antonio García López (criminal), also known as Toño Bicicleta, notorious Puerto Rican criminal
- Antonio López García, Spanish painter
- Guillermo García-López, Spanish tennis player
- José Luis García-López, Spanish comic book artist
- Ricardo García López, known as K-Hito, Spanish caricaturist, film producer, and humorist
