= CEPS =

CEPS may refer to:

- Centre for European Policy Studies, a think tank based in Belgium
- Central Europe Pipeline System, a NATO system delivering fuel around Europe
- Customs Excise and Preventive Service, a Government of Ghana agency

== See also ==
- Cep (disambiguation)
