= Atrévete-te-te =

2006 single by Calle 13

Single by Calle 13

from the album Calle 13
- Released: January 2006
- Genre: Alternative reggaeton; cumbia
- Length: 3:58
- Label: White Lion
- Songwriters: Eduardo Cabra; René Pérez
- Producer: Eduardo Cabra

Calle 13 singles chronology
"Se Vale To-To" (2005)	"Atrévete-te-te" (2006)	"La Jirafa" (2006)

"Atrévete-te-te" (English: "Dare Yourself-self-self") is a song by Puerto Rican urban duo Calle 13 from their eponymous debut album Calle 13, released in February 2006, by White Lion Records. It is one of the duo’s best-known songs. It was a hit single in many Latin American countries. The video for this single won the Latin Grammy Award for Best Short Form Music Video at the 2006 Latin Grammy Awards. The song is featured in the soundtrack of Grand Theft Auto IV and was later named the second-best single of the decade by Latin music website Club Fonograma.

== Song information ==
"Atrévete-te-te" is based on a Colombian cumbia beat and a clarinet riff also typical of traditional music from Colombia’s coast. It was especially popular in that country.

The lyrics found in the song contain Spanglish words such as "estárter" and anglicisms such as "lighter" and "wiper" are used to create rhymes, a reflection of the use of English on the island due to Puerto Rico's status as a Commonwealth in free association with the United States. The song has been featured in an MTV Tres commercial.

It was used in a version of the song for Manuel Rosales' 2006 presidential campaign in Venezuela. Rosales' campaign motto was "Atrévete."

== Pop culture references ==
The song makes several references to different pop culture themes, such as:

- Japanese video game Street Fighter
- British rock band Coldplay
- American punk rock band Green Day
- 2003 Quentin Tarantino film Kill Bill: Volume 1
- The Latino punk music genre

Agüeybaná, one of the powerful Taíno caciques from Puerto Rico’s history, is also mentioned, as are the cities of Bayamón and Guaynabo, Puerto Rico (this last one mentioned as to reinforce the song subject’s aloofness and scorn for Latino and Puerto Rican influences, versus her liking of the rather “foreign” references mentioned above). The dancers on the song’s video are Marilyn Monroe lookalikes, each dressed in blonde wig and a skimpier version of Monroe’s famed The Seven Year Itch dress.

== Credits and personnel ==
- Vocals: René Pérez
- Production: Eduardo Cabra
- Lyrics: René Pérez
- Instruments: clarinet, bass, dembow
- Mixing: Colin Michaels

== Chart performance ==
The song became a big success on the Billboard Hot Latin Songs chart, peaking at number 15. It also peaked at number six on the U.S. Latin Tropical Airplay chart.

== Charts ==
Chart (2006)	Peak position
Chile Top 40 Airplay	1
US Hot Latin Songs (Billboard)	15
US Latin Tropical Airplay (Billboard)	6
US Latin Rhythm Airplay (Billboard)	8
Venezuela (Record Report)	2

== Certifications ==
Region	Certification	Certified units/sales
Mexico (AMPROFON) Ringtone	Gold	10,000^{*}
Spain (Promusicae)	3× Platinum	180,000^{‡}
^{*} Sales figures based on certification alone.^{‡} Sales+streaming figures based on certification alone.
