= Workers' Socialist Movement (Puerto Rico) =

Puerto Rican political organization

Workers' Socialist Movement Movimiento Socialista de los Trabajadores
- Founded: 1982
- Youth wing: Unión de Juventudes Socialistas
- Ideology: Socialism; Democratic socialism Revolutionary socialism Multi-tendency
- Political position: Left-wing to far-left

The Workers' Socialist Movement (Spanish: Movimiento Socialista de los Trabajadores, MST) is a Puerto Rican democratic socialist revolutionary organization, formed in 1982 and dedicated to the self-organization and self-emancipation of the working-class in Puerto Rico, as well as international solidarity with the workers struggles worldwide. It is usually known as the "MST", and its youth section is the Unión de Juventudes Socialistas (Union of Socialist Youth), also known as the "UJS-MST" or simply "UJS". The MST supports a socialist and independent Puerto Rico.

== Politics ==
The MST's politics are democratic socialist and revolutionary, emphasizing the centrality of class as a motor of history. Rather than describing itself as "Marxist", it prefers the term "Dialectical Materialist", feeling the term "Marxist" to have been narrowed by history to represent a single set of views on socialism and class-based revolutionary struggle.

As a multi-tendency organization, with a culture of debate and ideological discussion, there are people within its membership and leadership who visualize themselves as anarchists, Anti-Revisionists, communists, democratic socialists, Maoists, revolutionary socialists, syndicalists, and Trotskyists.

The MST is a 'cadre' organization, meaning membership is not open to the wider public, however the party is open and not clandestine.

According to supportes, "what they have in common is a commitment to revolutionary action, and to worker's self-emancipation, which leads to a belief that differences in opinion are a positive feature in a revolutionary organization".

== History ==
The MST was formed in 1982 by the merger of two socialist groups, the Maoist Partido Socialista Revolucionario/PSR (Revolutionary Socialist Party) and the Guevarist/Marxist-Leninist Movimiento Socialista Popular (Popular Socialist Movement).

Later, in 1984, the Liga Internacionalista de los Trabajadores/LIT (Workers' Internationalist League (Puerto Rico)) also dissolved into the MST. Influenced by the Cuban Revolution, especially Che Guevara, the Chinese Revolution and Mao Zedong, and a number of similar revolutionary experiences worldwide, the MST began to replace the declining Puerto Rican Socialist Party as the predominant far-left group in Puerto Rico.

In 1990, the MST founded the Socialist Front along with the Partido Revolucionario de los Trabajadores Puertorriqueños-Macheteros/PRTP-Macheteros (Puerto Rican Revolutionary Workers' Party-Macheteros) and the Taller de Formacion Politica-TFP (Political Education Workshop), an alliance of radical-left groups.

Among its supporters are Rafael Feliciano Hernández twice-elected leader of the Teachers' Federation of Puerto Rico, on an openly socialist platform; Victor Rodriguez, student leader and spokesman of the UJS in the University of Puerto Rico at Rio Piedras; Pedro Colon Almenas, former political prisoner.

== Current activities ==
The MST publishes a monthly 8-page newspaper, Bandera Roja, formerly of the MSP, and in continuous publication since 1974. Its webpage first went online in 1996, acquired the domain name "bandera.org" in 1997 and has had the current PHP driven format since 1999.

It is currently asserting itself after leaving the Socialist Front, as in heavily involved in the struggles against re-structuring programs, including the current fiscal crisis in government.

It is also visible in the struggle to call attention to the untried murder case of MSP founding member and Cuban exile Carlos Muñiz Varela, and the attempts on the part of the government to repress protests against the continued coverup in that case, including the recent homage paid for by the Legislature to suspected intellectual author of Muñiz's murder, Julio Labatud.
