= Socialist Front (Puerto Rico) =

Coalition of far-left and pro-independence political organizations in Puerto Rico

Socialist Front Frente Socialista
- Founded: 1990
- Ideology: Marxism; Revolutionary socialism Socialism; Multi-tendency; Puerto Rico Independence
- Political position: Left-wing to far-left
- Regional affiliation: São Paulo Forum

The Socialist Front (Spanish: Frente Socialista, FS) is a coalition of far-left and pro-independence political organizations in Puerto Rico. The Socialist Front also includes non-partisan activists.

The FS was launched on November 4, 1990, as an initiative of the Socialist Workers' Movement (MST) joining with the Political Formation Workshop and the Puerto Rican Workers Party-Macheteros. In 2005 the MST officially disaffiliated with the Frente Socialista, and Puerto Rican Workers' Revolutionary Party, and the Political Education Workshop did the same in 2008, but the Frente has continued on. The Frente's principal spokespersons were Rafael Bernabe Riefkohl and Jorge Farinacci.

Affiliated group:

- Communist Refoundation - a segment of the old Puerto Rican Communist Party

The FS participates in the São Paulo Forum and the World Social Forum. Its supporters in New York City are organized in the Working Group on Puerto Rico.

In 2006, the leader Jorge Farinacci García died of cancer, prompting a message of condolences from the Party for Socialism and Liberation.

== Ideology ==
As a coalition of multiple tendencies, opinions often vary internally, however, amongst its stated public positions; it has supported general strikes, supports the presidency of Nicolás Maduro, and has previously condemned acts of terrorism, saying:

Motivated by the esteem and respect for human life that inspires our socialist ideals, we reject all attacks that irresponsibly or indiscriminately attempts against the life of any human being. Conscientious of the difference between the governments and the peoples, we repudiate all actions that, to strike governments, or to protest against some measures, however unjust they may be, strike in its place defenseless people.

== Endorsements ==
In the 2000 Puerto Rican elections, the FS endorsed the Puerto Rican Independence Party. In the 2004 elections, the Socialist Front promoted a voting boycott but condemned the MINH's support for the pro-Commonwealth Popular Democratic Party (PPD). Furthermore, the Socialist Front sustained and nurtured its decades-long alliance with the Puerto Rican Nationalist Party and the Puerto Rican Independence Party (PIP).
