= Carrier-envelope phase =

The carrier-envelope phase (CEP) or carrier-envelope offset (CEO) phase is an important feature of an ultrashort laser pulse and gains significance with decreasing pulse duration, in a regime where the pulse consists of a few wavelengths. Physical effects depending on the carrier-envelope phase fall into the category of highly nonlinear optics.

== CEP in the time domain ==
CEP in the time domain: A pulse train of five consecutive pulses with linearly varying CEP is depicted. Depending on its value the relative delay between the carrier (black) and the envelope (blue dashed) is different.

The CEP $\phi_0$ is the phase between the carrier wave and the position of the intensity envelope of the pulse (cf. figure in the time domain). In a train of multiple pulses it is usually varying due to the difference between phase and group velocity. The time, after which the phase increases resp. decreases by $2 \pi$ is called $T_\mathrm{CEO}$. Ideally, it is an integer multiple of the duration $T_\mathrm{rep}$ between two pulses and the pulses are picked at the corresponding rate to obtain a constant phase over all picked pulses. Besides this linear evolution, fluctuations which are common in conventional femtosecond laser systems usually cause a nonlinear shot-to-shot fluctuation of the CEP. This is why measuring and controlling it is very important for many applications.

== CEP in the frequency domain and measurement ==
CEP in the frequency domain: The frequency spectrum of the above pulse train is a frequency comb which shows an offset if it is continued until a frequency of zero. This offset is the carrier-envelope frequency $f_\mathrm{CEO}$, and $f_\mathrm{rep}=1/T_\mathrm{rep}$ is the repetition rate

In the frequency domain, a pulse train is represented by a frequency comb. Here, the carrier-envelope frequency $f_\mathrm{CEO}=\frac{1}{T_\mathrm{CEO}}=\frac{\mathrm{d} \phi_0}{\mathrm{d} t}$ is exactly the offset frequency of the pulse train, cf. figure. This makes it possible to perform a multi-shot measurement of the CEP, for example by using an f-2f interferometer. Here, the pulses to be measured are broadened to a bandwidth of at least one octave. A long-wavelength part of the pulse is frequency doubled and the beat note between it and the short-wavelength part of the fundamental pulse is measured. This is better known as the offset phase.

With a phase-locked loop, a property of the laser oscillator such as the optical path length can be adjusted correspondingly to the obtained offset frequency and thus the phase can be stabilized.

== Bibliography ==
- Paschotta, Rüdiger. "Carrier-envelope offset, CEO frequency, CEP, absolute phase". Encyclopedia of Laser Physics and Technology.
- Krausz, Ferenc; Ivanov, Misha (2 February 2009). "Attosecond physics". Reviews of Modern Physics. 81 (1): 163–234. Bibcode:2009RvMP...81..163K. doi:10.1103/RevModPhys.81.163.
