= Ricanstruction =

American musical group

- Origin: New York City, United States
- Genre: punk rock
- Years active: 1990s–2006
- Website: ricanstruction.net

Ricanstruction was a New York City based Puerto Rican punk/hip hop/salsa/jazz/reggae fusion musical group and artist collective. When Ricanstruction first started, the band consisted of lead vocalist Not4Prophet (also known as N4P, Zero Prophet and Alano P. Baez, born in Ponce, Puerto Rico), bassist Arturo "R2O" Rodriguez, drummer Joseph "SickFoot" Rodriguez from Harlem, and guitarist Eddie "Alsiva" Alsina. Other members of Ricanstruction through the years have included vocalist Taína Asili (formerly of the punk band Anti-Product), percussionist Roger Vasquez (who left the band to join Latin Rock band Ill Niño), and guitarists Fidel Paulino and Steven "Albizoo" Maldonado.

== History ==
In the 1980s Arturo Rodriguez (bassist), Joseph Rodriguez (drums), Eddie Alsina (guitar) and the late Gary Cintron (vocalist) formed an all-Puerto Rican hardcore rock / salsa band called 'Strange Seed'. They would later work with singer John Joseph, of the Cro-Mags, in the band 'Both Worlds'. In the mid 1990s, the brothers Rodriguez met with Not4Prophet (Alano Baez, who had recently left the US Army) in order to start a new band fusing their funk rock style with Not4Prophet's soulful vocals and politically infused anti-corporate lyrics. Ricanstruction performed for the last time on 23 September 2006 at a United Nations rally, demanding independence for their homeland, Puerto Rico. The band resurfaced in 2010 for one surprise show in East Harlem, New York, performing as "The Dynamite Bros.", featuring Arturo and Joseph Rodriguez, Not4prophet, and Fidel Paulino, along with DJ "Johnny Juice" Rosado from X-Vandals on percussion, and John Restrepo of the Welfare Poets on saxophone.

== Gigs and tours ==
Ricanstruction began to gig in local New York City clubs and squats in the mid 1990s at places such as CBGB, The Continental, ABC No Rio, Webster Hall, The Knitting Factory, Wetlands and many other venues. They developed a loyal cross-cultural cult following, and in 1998 were the first artists signed to CBGB Records by club and label owner Hilly Kristal. They began to tour in support of their albums while continuing to gig at local clubs, empty lots, and block parties as they felt it important to reach the common people. The band played shows in Central America, the Caribbean, and across the United States.

== Activism ==
Due to Ricanstruction's activism and lyrical content, Tower Records Japan decided that the band was too radical for the Japanese market and banned the stock and sale of Ricanstruction albums. Tower Records in Miami, Florida followed suit shortly thereafter.

== Albums ==
- EPB (1997)
- Liberation Day (1998)
- Abu Jamal (1999)
- UnAmerican (2001)
- Love+Revolution (2004)
