= Águila Blanca (heist) =

1983 robbery in West Hartford, Connecticut, US

Águila Blanca (named after José Maldonado Román and meaning "White Eagle" in English) was the name given by Los Macheteros (a guerrilla group seeking Puerto Rican independence from the United States) to its robbery of a Wells Fargo depot on September 12, 1983, a day coinciding with the birth date of Puerto Rican Nationalist Pedro Albizu Campos. The robbery took place in West Hartford, Connecticut, and netted more than US$7 million (equivalent to more than $22.6 million in 2025). At the time of the robbery, it was the largest cash heist in U.S. history.

The specific cell responsible for it was known as Los Taínos. According to the Macheteros, part of the money was given to the poor communities of Puerto Rico to fund education, food, housing, clothing and toys for children. According to prosecutors, the money was used to finance Los Macheteros. About $80,000 in what was believed to be stolen money was seized by Federal Bureau of Investigation (FBI) agents during searches in Puerto Rico and Boston. The federal government contends that the group spent about $1 million, moved more than $2 million to Cuba, and hid $4 million in safe deposit boxes, certificates of deposit, savings accounts and farmhouse cellars in Puerto Rico.

The FBI charges for this robbery include obstruction of commerce by robbery and conspiracy, bank robbery, aggravated robbery, theft from interstate shipment, foreign and interstate transportation of stolen money, and conspiracy to interfere with commerce by robbery.

== Strategy and execution ==
Wells Fargo used to store large amounts of money in its depot at Culbro Industrial Park in West Hartford, exploiting a lack of public awareness about it and the city's industrial nature to keep as much as $30 million at the site. The corporation employed individuals at minimum wage, hoping to offset losses caused by an increase in competition. However, this mostly attracted employees with little to no experience. This branch was managed by Jim McKeon, who took the job after only five months of guard duty. This lack of experience manifested itself in his management of the delivery routes and assets, where he granted liberty beyond the rule book to his subordinates for the sake of completing the task with the resources available. McKeon employed 25-year old Víctor Manuel Gerena as his second in command, with both starting their employment with the company with only a month of difference. Among his coworkers, Gerena gained a reputation as a stoic individual, distancing his personal life from most, but his work load earned him one of the vault's keys.

Gerena was sued for the child support of two daughters and lacked any means of transportation when he became engaged to his then girlfriend Liza Soto. On August 29, 1983, he rented a Chevrolet Malibu at a non-credit locale named Ugly Duckling Rent-A-Car and brought it to the Wells Fargo depot as a test to see if McKeon's laxity would allow it to be parked inside the delivery van area adjacent to the vault. He claimed that it was borrowed from a friend who would be mad if it was damaged by vandals and thieves who frequented the area. Having accomplished this goal, Gerena completed his schedule as usual and finished the work day without incident. He requested a full-size vehicle from the same locale on Friday, September 9, 1983, this time, a 1978 Mercury Marquis, and received a clearance from its manager to keep it throughout the weekend. However, this plan suffered a setback when this vehicle failed and the lessee replaced it with a 1973 Buick LeSabre. On September 12, 1983, four days after his planned wedding, Gerena drove the rented car to work, and after arriving at 11 a.m., discovered that he and a coworker, Tim Girard, were locked out of the depot. After being called, McKeon arrived along another employee, Bob Shewokis, and opened the doors.

Gerena requested, and received, permission to park the LeSabre in bay five of the loading dock, but this prompted a similar request by Girard who parked his in bay four. Both then took a route between West Hartford and Bridgeport, leaving McKeon short-handed of guards. The manager recruited Shewokis, who was not legally allowed to carry a gun, as his only companion in a route that took them to West Springfield and emptied the depot's vault into the vehicle they were driving. However, McKeon dropped Sheowkis in the return trip and drove the loaded van to the depot by himself. Once there, the manager decided to leave the van loaded parked in the loading dock and waited for the other truck to arrive with the second key of the set required to open the vault. Once Gerena's van arrived, Girard moved his car out of bay four, leaving only Gerena's car and the Wells Fargo vans inside. McKeon, in a haste due to a previous commitment, explained to Gerena that the funds from West Springfield were still in the van as the latter began unloading money bags into the vault by himself.

The plan suffered another setback when Girard stayed behind instead of leaving as usual after this task was completed, unable to reach his house due to construction. McKeon volunteered to drive him home after counting the second van, and Girard went to sleep meanwhile. While the manager was dealing with the relevant bureaucracy, Gerena told him that his .38 gun was falling off his holster (originally borrowed from Gerena himself) and shortly afterwards used this as a distraction to extract the weapon from the broken holder. While held at gunpoint, McKeon chose to follow orders, while Girard assumed that it was a joke and did not realize it was serious initially, which prevented him from drawing the weapon fast enough to react in time. Aware of this, the manager asked him not to draw the weapon to avoid getting caught in the crossfire. Girard dropped to the floor while McKeon placed his hands behind his back and was handcuffed. Gerena bound both with tape and rope, taped and placed jackets over their heads before injecting both with a solution that was meant to make them feel drowsy but which failed to act after being diluted in two doses instead of the planned single shot. Gerena apologized for the assault and moved the manager away from the vault door, systematically selecting which money to remove from it, leaving behind coins and most uncirculated currency. Girard and McKeon noted that he removed the car's backup wheel and made several trips with a cart that he would use to move the money from the vault to it, until $7,017,152 were loaded. Aware that the sedative had failed, he made several checks on the status of his coworkers.

Gerena concluded by loading another gun and a shot gun, then honking the horn of the car to what is believed to have been a signal to another individual and then left the premises. McKeon and Girard struggled to release their bonds afterwards, but by the time that they managed to contact the police, officers Jack Casey, Jack Bannan, and George Mucha were outside the compound waiting for the security measures to be dropped. The police, however, were skeptical when they were told that at least five million dollars were taken from the vault and assumed that the case was easy since the identity of the perpetrator was known, instead focusing on securing the crime scene. Meanwhile, Gerena met associates working for the EPB near a motel, handing over the money and his identification. From here, both parties went in different directions, with the other Macheteros heading to Boston and dropping his identification along the way. Gerena headed to New York, and after being provided counterfeit documents traveled south and crossed the border, subsequently traveling to Cuba.

== Investigation ==
=== Eastern states ===
The case was placed in the charge of Lt. John Suchocki and Lt. Duffy, while McKeon and Girard were transported to a hospital. The Hartford police department was alerted to raid Gerena's apartment, where Gerena's girlfriend, Liza Soto, was interviewed and contacted his family. His brother, ex-wife, and an ex-girlfriend were also interrogated to no avail. All of these measures failed, and the police were unable to pinpoint Gerena's location. They lost track of his plausible locations by finding the car, which was later found parked outside a motel, and the knowledge of the locale that leased it. Jim Millan, an FBI agent that worked on bank robberies, was placed in charge of the search for Gerena. Despite receiving media attention at the behest of attorney John Bailey, the recovery of the vehicle failed to provide notable clues. The only piece of evidence found was the revolver and shotgun that Gerena had used during the heist. The possibility that he had boarded a plane in the adjacent Brainard Field was entertained, but soon dropped. Instead the search turned to an area of wilderness that was near the motel, where they speculated that he could have a second getaway vehicle or have received help. The area and nearby buildings failed to provide any evidence after several days of search. With the police's morale being affected by a number of false leads and media hype, they interviewed individuals who claimed to have relationships with Gerena, only to later admit that they lied. Attempts were made to recover the samples taken from McKeon at Hartford Hospital, but they had disappeared. The time lapse between when Gerena injected them and the tests performed on McKeon and Girard, and their limited spectrum, failed to return any known drug. Meanwhile, Wells Fargo offered a $350,000 reward for his capture.

The Boston Herald labeled the event "The Big Sleep Heist". The heist was the largest single-handed in American history and the second largest in total. The EPB would later draw parallels between the heist and the Boston Tea Party, labeling it "an act of retaliative expropriation against a federal government that had benefited from the Puerto Rican resources since displacing local farmers during the implantation of the sugar cane industry". Gerena's image instantly gathered him popularity by reflecting a hint of the middle class' frustrations with the establishment, with his photo even being exhibited in a store. There was a general perception that the heist had taken "bank money, not people money", which was reinforced by their own frustrations with the corporate economy. Even among the policemen assigned to track him down, he managed to muster a form of respect due to his boldness. A week later, T-shirts with his photo and the slogan "Go For It" were being sold in Hartford.

Lacking any solid evidence, the investigation turned to determining where Gerena had traveled in the time that he had the rented car. With 60 miles unaccounted for, the police unsuccessfully attempted to locate a storage for the money within radius of 15 and 30 miles. Hartford police chief Frank Reynolds and FBI state chief Lon Lacey held a meeting to discuss the future of the search, with the first requesting to host the headquarters for the nationwide investigation in an effort to remain relevant to the case. A limited cooperation with the upper echelons of the Hartford PD was agreed, but the FBI retained all real jurisdiction of the case. The copies left behind at Hartford would later allow the press insights into the case. Searches of Gerena's apartment and his call list came up empty, with only his passport being recovered. Liza Soto was arrested and interrogated, but after being threatened with felony charges, insisted that she did not know about the significance of the Buick, despite having ridden in it during the weekend. Her attorney, Michael Graham, quickly took the matter public and threatened taking legal action if the interrogations continued and eventually municipal attorneys intervened. The media swiftly covered the case and the interviews ceased. Unable to continue this line of inquiry, the interviewers turned to those close to her, with the police discovering that she was a supporter of Puerto Rican independence from an employer that felt that she had once wore a shirt that was "un-American". Despite this, up to this point the political ideology of the couple had not been investigated and since this was an isolated piece of information that pointed towards it, the line of inquiry was dropped. A week and a half after the heist, a West Hartford detective was directly told that the "Macheteros did it", but ignored it due to a lack of evidence that Gerena was politically militant.

With no useful information coming from his(whose?) sources, the investigation turned to former schoolmates and employers, encountering no information. No negative testimony came from those interviewed and the police concluded that he was most likely influenced by desperation brought forth by debt. Millan and Duffy put pressure on César Carmona, an old friend of Gerena and godfather to one of his daughters. Carmona insisted that Gerena would only do something like this for the benefit of a cause that he considered worthy, and that Gerena strongly supported Puerto Rican independence. Further into the interrogation, Carmona noted that Gerena had asked for his pickup truck the night before the heist but he refused. This alarmed the authorities, who mistrusted Carmona due to past arrests related to political activism. They requested a polygraph test, but the results were negative. In October, with no further leads, Millan and Duffy went to Carmona's house, only to be told to come back with a warrant. Months later, while Carmona was facing an unrelated legal case, Millan and Duffy tried to convince him to talk about Gerena in exchange for the charges being dropped. This tactic failed when Carmona's charges were dropped for entirely unrelated reasons; agents Millan and Duffy then tried instead to convince Carmona to talk about Gerena in exchange for offering him Gerena's bounty once it was recovered, which Carmona declined. Both the police and Wells Fargo were hounded by hoaxers trying to impede their progress and mock the authorities, with the company eventually closing its local operation.

=== Puerto Rico ===
On October 30, 1983, an anti-tank rocket was fired against the Federal Building where Puerto Rico's FBI headquarters were at the time. The EPB soon took responsibility for the attack and noted that it was a warning in response to the Invasion of Grenada on October 25, five days previous. The organization referred to this as "Operación La Guillotina" and despite claiming success publicly, its strategists were frustrated that due to a lack of vantage points the commandoes had been unable to target the FBI offices directly, the use of registered cars and a deviation from the planned escape route. The FBI was able to track down the precedence of the cars and were able to find a traffic ticket attributed to a "Pedro Almodova Rivera" and using the information provided in this license, discovered the hideout of Filiberto Ojeda Ríos who had been on their wanted list for 13 years and who they claimed was a Cuban intelligence officer besides a leader in the EPB and coordinator of several pro-independence factions. However, instead of arresting him, they opted to tail him and learn what they could of his associates.

Led by Lacey, FBI surveilled the compound throughout the day six days a week from an adjacent building. The bureau spent $8 million in the investigation and tapped several vehicles, buildings and public telephones and recorded all adjacent activity. In November, Gerena defied the Hartford authorities by sending letters to his mother and girlfriend, apparently from Buffalo. After being deemed authentic, another unsuccessful search took place in the city. The use of the phrase "Big Sleep Heist" previously used by the Boston Herald raised suspicions that Gerena had been in the area or had collaborators there, but the ensuing FBI investigation failed to provide results.

The FBI continued gathering information of the Macheteros that visited Ojeda, unaware that they were under surveillance and not yet noticing the activity in the neighborhood. José Rodríguez was placed in charge of the Puerto Rican investigation, while the bureau was experiencing problems piecing together the information due to the EPB's use of pseudonyms. The tails' conversations were archived at the local FBI headquarters, where the bureau would try to identify the individuals recorded. During this process, they discovered that the EPB was organizing a flight to New York, planting agents in the plane where one had traveled. There they tailed a total of three Macheteros in their meeting with another individual and to New Paltz, where they entered an RV. However, during the surveillance the FBI agents assigned left the premises and once they returned, the EPB members had left and the bureau only had a Texas license plate number as evidence. Once they checked the number, they learned that it was linked to another of Ojeda's pseudonyms, Juvenal Concepción (which he used in Southborough, Massachusetts as well) and that negotiation to buy the RV had been concluded the day before the Wells Fargo heist. Unwilling to compromise the investigation in Puerto Rico, the FBI opted not to leak knowledge of the trip. Theory that Gerena had traveled to Boston and later used in the RV to enter Mexico on September 27, 1983. The check used to purchase it was traced to Baybank Harvard Trust, where the cameras recorded Segarra doing the transaction under the alias of "K. Fishman". Despite linking the heist to the EPB, the FBI was unable to do anything with the information without any piece of concrete evidence and the focus returned to Puerto Rico.

In April 1984, the Puerto Rico Police casually discovered an EPB safe house while investigating another crime scene, noticing an explosive artifact and a weapons cache. They transferred jurisdiction to the FBI, which also found documents attributed to the group, among which were payroll notes filled with codenames. On May 7, 1984, the FBI tracked Ojeda as he took a trip to New York and traveled to Springfield, Massachusetts, and rendezvoused with two colleagues who arrived in the RV and traveled to Bellingham. Afterwards, they recovered a single piece of paper linked to Houston International Airport. The EPB members held a reunion in Dorchester and discussed what to do with the RV, eventually leaving it at Boston, where the pursuing agents later seized it. Despite this, the FBI was unable to track the money until Ojeda complained about the use that people apparently higher in the EPB was giving to it by allowing the Cubans the chance to guard it instead of using a place where it could be handled as a collective without external intervention, inadvertently revealing that it had been transported from Mexico to Cuba to the wiretaps.

In July 1984, the local FBI informed their counterparts in the states of the Cuban involvement, surprising Millan and Duffy, who had assumed that Gerena could be in Canada based on a trip mentioned by an ex-girlfriend and which had led to a collaboration with the Mounted Police and a search there. On January 25, 1985, the EPB attacked the Federal Court Building with a bazooka, in protest to the presence of an American military recruit center within it. On April 2, 1985, the EPB criticized that people uninvolved in the heist were being pressured in the grand jury investigation, and sent a banknote taken during the heist as proof that the group was responsible for it. Following a threat of retaliation, the subpoenas issued to third parties were dropped.

=== Public revelation ===
The surveillance soon revealed that Gerena would take credit for the heist on behalf of the EPB in a press event to be held on September 24, 1984. Following the leak of FBI declarations in a 1982 hearing in apparent conjunction with the investigation, the bureau stopped its communication with the Hartford police. As the anniversary of the heist approached, the uninformed public created its own narratives, linking the heist to a number of farcical motives, including links to the mob, an accomplice within Gerena's own family, or that Gerena had a female companion in a contemporary parallel to Bonnie and Clyde. Ironically, the political angle was the most accurate but also the least popular among the rumors circling the case, but it linked Gerena with the FALN. In West Hartford, it was reported that an FBI agent leaked to the press that Gerena would be talking to the media on Labor Day, although the date was off the rumor proved accurate. As expected, Gerena revealed his affiliation to the EPB by sending a series of postcards to the media on September 9, 1984, but they arrived weeks later. One of then was sent to the Hartford Courant and addressed to one of its former correspondents, Mark Stillman, from where it was relayed to the local police, who certified that the hand writing was real. In it, Gerena congratulated Stillman and fellow reporter Dave Lesher for a story published half a year before, but also noted that their guest, crime author Jay Robert Nash, was only partially correct about his assumption that he had targeted Wells Fargo to get back at the system and get the "American Dream" and promised to clear the misconceptions in the future. The Hartford Courant ran the story in its headline, calling it "Notes from the Underground".

The San Juan headquarters of the Associated Press and EFE received similar postcards criticizing the United States intervention in Latin America and warning of an impending announcement, as did newspaper El Mundo, but unaware of the Hartford angle were unable to do much with them. In all of his letters, Gerena used a card that depicted a prominent American symbol with a double meaning intended, in particular the Statue of Liberty as a symbol for Puerto Rican independence. The use of sophisticated Spanish and a change in his signature fueled speculation about exactly when Gerena had joined the EPB. On October 19, 1984, an unidentified Machetero contacted a United Press International reporter in Puerto Rico directing her to a communiqué where the EPB took full responsibility for the heist, which was codenamed Pitirre III and considered one in a series of "military economic operative[s]" carried out by the group against Wells Fargo and by extension, the American economy. The group also explained the reason behind the date, the birthday of Pedro Albizu Campos, and clarified that Gerena had trained with them for more than a year before the event. The letter made the presence of the EPB known to the American public at Hartford, which in turn changed their support towards Gerena to criticism as the idea of revolution became known. The FBI became secretive through the year's end, virtually severing its communication with the police and media. Meanwhile, the EPB made attempts to contact the Hartford media through calls and postcards.

On December 26, 1984, Norman Ramírez arrived with the intention of organizing a publicity stunt where they would hand gifts while dressed as kings (a traditional Latin American practice to celebrate the Epiphany), but was soon confronted by the leader of the New York branch of the EPB, who considered it unnecessarily presumptuous. However, the local second-in-command green-lighted the event with the approval of Juan Segarra. In Puerto Rico, this act earned the disapproval of Ojeda, who insisted that the stunt broke the chain of command and places the EPB at risk. Nevertheless, on January 6, 1985, three EPB commandos rented a van and gave presents to the children in the neighborhood where Gerena lived in West Hartford. An FBI agent participated in the give away and recorded everything that took place. Photos of the event were later sent to El Mundo and Hartford Courant, where the group took responsibility and justified that it was Christmas and a poor neighborhood. The story was soon spread to the Puerto Rican media through a call to El Mundo. However, within the EPB, concerns grew over Segarra's attitude following the stunt and his taste for exhibition, which clashed with the group's clandestine nature.

== Trial ==
=== Arrests ===
Most of the suspects, except Gerena, Segarra and the González brothers, were arrested during the morning of August 30, 1985. More than 30 separate locations were raided in the municipalities of Carolina, Caguas, Bayamón, Vega Baja, Luquillo and Guaynabo, and nonlethal tactics were used to ensure a trial. Puerto Rican authorities were not warned beforehand, and no warrants were shown. In one case, Ojeda opened fire on FBI agents as they climbed the stairs to his apartment in an attempt to hold them at bay. One agent was partially blinded by a ricocheting bullet, and the standoff gave Ojeda enough time to dispose of incriminating EPB documents. Afterwards, he walked outside with a pistol and an UZI submachine gun, but after a sharpshooter shot the UZI, the agents were able to arrest him. There was also controversy over the procedures, in particular over a 10-year old being allowed to go to the bathroom only with an armed agent by his side and the seizing of useless evidence such as an unfinished novel, cultural recordings and children's cassettes. That same day, the first set of accusations related to the heist were issued, with Gerena, Ojeda, Segarra, Jorge Farinacci, Avelino González and Norberto González being the main defendants on charges of Theft from an Interstate Shipment, Interference of Shipment by Robbery and Robbery of Federally Insured Bank Funds.

Several others were also charged, of which only Paul Weinberg was not accused as a member of the EPB, for a total of 19 defendants. Towards this argument, the federal government created a scale to systematically assign a portion of the seven millions to one of four banks; the Bank of Boston, the Connecticut National Bank, the New England Savings Bank and the Connecticut Bank and Trust Company. Gerena was issued additional charges of Aggravated Robbery of Federal Insured Bank Funds for disabling the guards. The defendants charged with Conspiracy to Interfere with Commerce by Robbery and Conspiracy to Rob Federally Insured Funds, Conspiracy to Commit a Theft from Interstate Shipment and Conspiracy to Transport Stolen Money in Interstate and Foreign Commerce. Additional charges deal with the transportation of the money, including two separate accounts of Interstate Transportation of Stolen Money, one for moving the money upstate and another for moving $12,000 for the gift giveaway in Hartford, and Foreign Transportation of Stolen Money. The FBI presented 1,300 wiretap recordings that they considered evidence along surveillance photos and the material confiscated in the discovered safe house and the RV.

=== Hearings ===
The preliminary hearing in the case took place overseen by judge Justo Arenas, with the families of the accused holding a vigil in protest outside. Ojeda face the most severe sentence, up to 130 years, but even the secondary defendants faced twenty to forty years in prison. Feeling that most of the evidence was circumstantial and that the tales could be interpreted as political banter that could be interpreted accordingly by locals, the defense pushed to keep the trial in Puerto Rico, while the prosecution led by H. Manuel Hernández insisted in taking it abroad. Arenas opted to hold the removal hearing on September 1, 1985, with the prosecution requesting that the bail hearing was held in the preliminary hearing as well, but with the request was not granted. The defense requested five days to prepare for the bail hearing, which were granted, but the removal hearing remained scheduled for two days later. Feeling that it would hinder its case to hold the bail hearing in Connecticut, where the defendants were expected to be sent in a removal hearing, the defense instead opted to argue that they had not been able to meet their clients individually. Dismissing this argument, Arenas then accepted the prosecution's request to hold the bail hearing at once. The defense objected on the grounds that the warrants were missing information, including an official signature, which Arenas agreed but concluded that they were not "fatally defective".

Meanwhile, Segarra was arrested in Dallas, but refused to be interrogated without a lawyer. He was taken before a judge without assigned defense and opted to waive a removal hearing, being immediately sent to Oklahoma, where he spent two weeks in solitary confinement. A woman named Anne Gassin, with apparent ties to Segarra, was arrested and later offered a cooperation deal. In the removal hearing at Puerto Rico, Arenas sent the defendants to Hartford. The case was then taken to Connecticut, with the defendants being transported to an undisclosed location by helicopter and communications with them cut until the next hearing, as stipulated in Section E of the bail and detention statutes. Shortly afterwards, the EPB warned that they would respond with "great force".

On September 3, 1985, the detention hearing was seen by judge Owen Egan at a cordoned Federal Building in Hartford, with the defendants being escorted by heavily armed marshals accompanied by attack dogs and snipers being placed in the adjacent buildings. The defense, led by William Kunstler and Bruce Rubenstein, argued that the use of that kind of security would only bias the community and media against the defendants and demanded to know why they were not allowed to talk with their clients. The assigned attorney also felt that by not allowing the defendants to choose their own attorneys, those who specialized in political cases were excluded and it allowed the case to be simply processed as a common robbery without political motivations. Egan allowed a Puerto Rican lawyer to remain in court and the defendants were allowed to choose their lawyers, all of whom chose Puerto Rican lawyers who adopted the political angle. A bail hearing was held on September 13, 1985, while the defense returned to Puerto Rico to prepare their case and analyze the FBI's evidence.

The case was filled with ethnic tension, that led to a confrontation between one of the lawyers and a police officer. During the bail hearing, some of the defendants were released on bail, with some being ordered to pay in secured funds. However, most of the defendants were denied bail. The Macheteros held at the Metropolitan Correctional Center were assigned maximum security requiring special procedures status, the highest that the institution had. These measures kept them 22–23 hours a day in their cells, with no private visits being allowed between couples or children being allowed to visit. On September 23, 1985, the EPB published a communiqué praising the defendants as martyrs for their cause. However, there was an internal debate taking place within the organization, who debated if more actions against the federal government would affect the case of the defendants, leading to a cautious constraint.

In December 1985, nationalist paper Libertad warned the federal government that if the arrests continued they should "begin preparing their cemeteries also" because they intended to send federal agents (referred to as "mercenaries") back to them. That same month, the defendants issued a communiqué thanking the attention that they had received from the public. A poll conducted by Yankelovich, Skelly and White for El Nuevo Día showed that despite the majority of the population still condemned their tactics, around 41% consider their cause just, although their tactics were extreme. In February 1986, Farinacci who had been released on a $500,000 bail, returned to attend hearings in Hartford, he made use of these results to argue the case of the defendants and note that there was concern among independence advocates that the FBI could wire their houses. The event marked the introduction of American activists to the case. The pre-indictment hearing was led by judge Emmet Claire. One of the defense lawyers complained that his mail had been monitored, to the protest of the prosecution. On March 21, 1986, a second set of indictments were issued against the defendants. The initial removal was appealed, but on May 2, 1986, the Federal Appeals Court upheld Arenas' judgment.

On June 2, 1986, the defense requested for the case to move back to Puerto Rico, where the political motives would be understood and argued that the Sixth Amendment of the US Constitution offered a right to be tried in the district of offense and cited SCOTUS precedents of defendants being tried in their own community. Michael Deutsch brought in sociolinguist William Labov who exposed that due to low quality recording, only native Spanish speakers had been able to understand words in what recorded in the tapes during tests, and that even then there was no agreement about what was being said. Labov argued that this diminished the possibility of a transcript being objective without the jury understanding the words and estimating the voice tones in the tapes. This was used to argue in favor of moving the case back to Puerto Rico and against employing an entirely American jury. Claire declined to move the case, citing that it revolved around a heist in Hartford and that the arguments would not involve Puerto Rican politics. Despite this, the prosecution had emphasized alleged EPB moves in Cuba and Nicaragua, both countries with strong ties to Communism. The defense then moved to argue the suppression of government evidence due to procedural errors in its collection that included being sealed months after dictated by procedure. Concern grew over the prolonged time of reclusion that the accused were spending in jail on preventive detention. On October 21, 1986, the US Court of Appeals for the Second District argued that such a period of pre-trial detention was unconstitutional. By December, Claire had begun to set bonds for the accused that were held for 15 months under preventive detention.

According to one of the group members, the federal officials prosecuting the case, in recognition of the international right of peoples of colonized countries to armed fight for their independence, never asked for the return of the money, and that some of the defendants were given either light or no sentences. The group asserts that the money was not used for personal gain, but to further the struggle for Puerto Rico's independence.

=== Sentences ===
Juan Segarra Palmer, one of the leaders of the group, was sentenced to 65 years in prison. In August 1999, he was one of the 16 FALN members who were offered clemency by President Bill Clinton, which included a condition that they renounce terrorism in any continued efforts for independence; Segarra Palmer agreed to the offer.

Filiberto Ojeda Rios was sentenced in absentia to 55 years in prison. His lawyer stated that Ojeda jumped bail because he did not think he could get a fair trial. In a case that drew criticism from the government of Puerto Rico, Ojeda was shot and killed in a shootout when the FBI raided his hideout in Puerto Rico in 2005.

In 2010, Avelino González-Claudio was sentenced for his part in planning the robbery to seven years in prison and "ordered to pay back the money," according to The Hartford Courant.

Victor Manuel Gerena is still at large and was one of the FBI Ten Most Wanted Fugitives until being removed from the list on December 15, 2016; having been on the list for over 32 years, he holds the record as the fugitive to have spent the most time on the list.

Roberto Maldonado-Rivera was sentenced to five years in prison and fined $100,000. He had served his sentence and was released several years prior to Clinton's clemency offer, though the clemency offer did include cancellation of any yet-unpaid portion of his $100,000 fine.

== See also ==
- List of large value U.S. robberies
