= Jorge Farinacci =

Puerto Rican politician

Jorge Aurelio Farinacci García

Personal details
- Born: 1949 San Germán, Puerto Rico
- Died: August 26, 2006 (aged 56–57) Hato Rey, Puerto Rico
- Education: University of Puerto Rico (BA); University of Puerto Rico School of Law (JD)
- Occupation: Former spokesperson of the Socialist Front

Jorge Aurelio Farinacci García (1949 – August 26, 2006) was a Puerto Rican politician and socialist. He held a strong pro-independence stance of Puerto Rico from the U.S. Farinacci died in the morning of August 26, 2006 from complications due to a brain tumor. Farinacci, spokesman of the Socialist Front, suffered from a lymphoma in the brain that had previously affected his kidneys and heart, but was unable to survive this third stage.

== Early life ==
Jorge Aurelio Farinacci García was born in 1949 in San Germán, Puerto Rico to a teacher and business manager (mother and father respectively). Shortly thereafter, the family moved to the metropolitan area of San Juan, where Farinacci grew up. Farinacci attended Gabriela Mistral High School in Río Piedras, Puerto Rico. He earned a bachelor's in Political Science from the University of Puerto Rico, Río Piedras Campus in 1966. Farinacci graduated from the University of Puerto Rico School of Law in 1973. During his time at university, he took an active part in the several pro-independence organizations, including the University Federation Pro Independencia (FUPI). During this time, Farinacci took an active stand protesting the policy of mandatory military service, fueled by the protests over the then-ongoing Vietnam War. As a result of his revolutionary involvements, Farinacci was suspended from selective service.

== Law career ==
Jorge Farinacci dedicated his life to various worker's struggles, remaining a virulent activist until his death in 2006. As Jorge's first job, he acted as an arbitrator in his capacity as a lawyer with the Bureau of Conciliation and Arbitration of the Department of Labor. Later, as a private practice lawyer, Farinarri represented workers and worker's unions. For most of his law career, Jorge worked with the Teamster's Union. Farinacci also worked for the Trade Union Law Firm.

== Political Involvement ==
Farinacci worked for the vast majority of his years towards the construction of an armed revolutionary movement to oust the U.S. from Puerto Rico.

By 1975, Farinacci was involved with a conjunction of clandestine political groups, collectively referred to as "The Organization", a group that would later evolve into both the Revolutionary Independence Movement in Arms (MIRA) and PRR (Partido Revolucionario de los Trabajadores Puertorriqueños), which would later be called (PRTP- Macheteros). Farinacci joined this group in 1977. The PRTP decided at its First Congress in April, 1983, to dismantle its military cells.

In 1981 Farinacci was subpoenaed by a Federal Grand Jury, but refused to testify. Charges against him were dropped for lack of evidence, however, a year later he was accused of robbing a bank. Farinacci was arrested on 30 August 1985 along with 11 of his fellow separatists. Those arrested were Filiberto Ojeda Rios, Hilton Fernández Diamante, Orlando Gonzalez Claudio, Ivonne Meléndez, Carlos M. Ayés Suárez, Luz Maria Berrios Berrios, Angel Diaz Ruiz, Elías Samuel Castro, Norman Ramírez Talavera, Isaac Camacho and Luis Alfredo Colón Osorio. The separatists were all arrested in association with the assault on a Wells Fargo deposit in Hartfort, Connecticut on September 12, 1983. Seven million dollars were deducted during the operation.

As a qualification in his plea bargain, Farinacci forced the court to stipulate of him, "You, however, take the position that the United States government has no authority to criminalize your effort to resist the colonial subjugation of your country, Puerto Rico, and your right under international law to work for the freedom and self-determination of your homeland. You believe that the Court has no jurisdiction over you and that you are not a criminal." Though he admitted to ordering the robbery, the court was forced further to stipulate that "It is acknowledged by the government ... that the robbery was perpetrated to fund the goals of the Macheteros."

When he left prison in 1994 (on five-years probation and barred permanently from practicing law), Farinacci joined the Direction of the Socialist Front (FS), an umbrella organization comprising numerous leftist disciplines. At the time of his death he was one of its spokesmen. Despite being barred from practicing law, Farinacci worked as a law instructor at the University of Mayagüez. Farinacci also acted as a representative of FS for several years in the United Nations ( UN ) in favor of the independence of Puerto Rico. Farinacci also became involved with the Workers' Revolutionary Party (PRT-Macheteros), formerly a division within the original (PRTP-Macheteros). The PRT-Macheteros eventually merged with other socialist organizations to form the Movement to Socialism(MAS) . The founding Congress of MAS in 2008 was partly dedicated to the memory of Farinacci García.

Farinacci also joined the editorial board of pro-independence newspaper Claridad when it was reorganized to reflect the entire patriotic movement in Puerto Rico.

Farinacci had also participated in the working group of the São Paulo Forum since 1999, and argued against the presence of the US Navy in the island Vieques. He strongly condemned the assassination of the leader of the Boricua Popular Army, Filiberto Ojeda Ríos, on the part of the FBI, on September 23 as 2005. Farinacci was also an ardent defender of the Cuban Revolution, and the Bolivarian Revolution in Venezuela, a country he had maintained with since before the arrival of President Hugo Chavez and who he visited in 2005.

Milagros Rivera, chair of the Cuba Solidarity Committee, who knew Farinacci from the University of Puerto Rico, said of Farinacci: "...He not only worked tirelessly to defend Cuba but was an anti-imperialist in the internationalist sense. He not only opposed U.S. interventions throughout Latin America but also supported the struggle of the Palestinians, the liberation movements in Africa ... of the oppressed everywhere. Fari was of a new breed."

== Death ==
In January, 2005, Farinacci was diagnosed with lymphoma in the kidney and then in the heart. He was in remission, when, in June, doctors found lymphoma in the brain. In July, he was admitted to Auxilio Mutuo Hospital in Hato Rey. He died in the hospital on August 26, 2006. He was buried on Monday, August 28, 2006, at the Angeles Memorial Park Cemetery, in Guaynabo, Puerto Rico. At the time of his death he was 56 years old.

From Saturday, September 9, 2006, in the evening, to Monday morning, more than 1,000 workers and their families, (pro-independence activists from across Puerto Rico) trade unionists and sympathizers of the Socialist Front, visited the Ehret funeral home in the suburb of Río Piedras to pay tribute to Farinacci.

== See also ==
- List of Puerto Ricans
- Corsican immigration to Puerto Rico
