= Cep (Jindřichův Hradec District) =

- Municipality
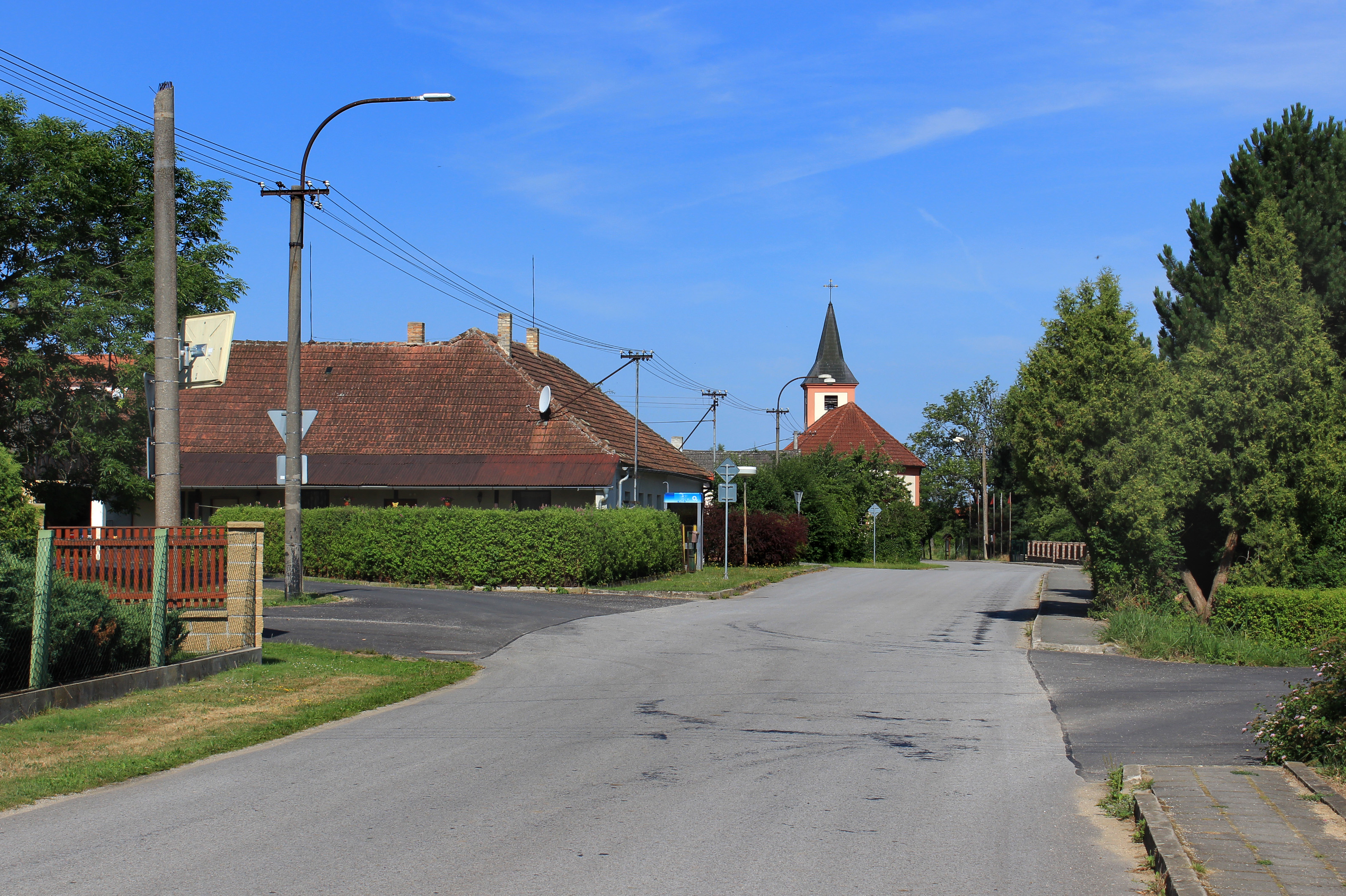
- Main street

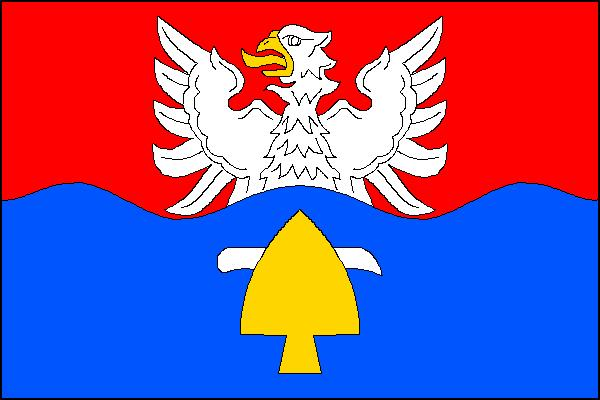
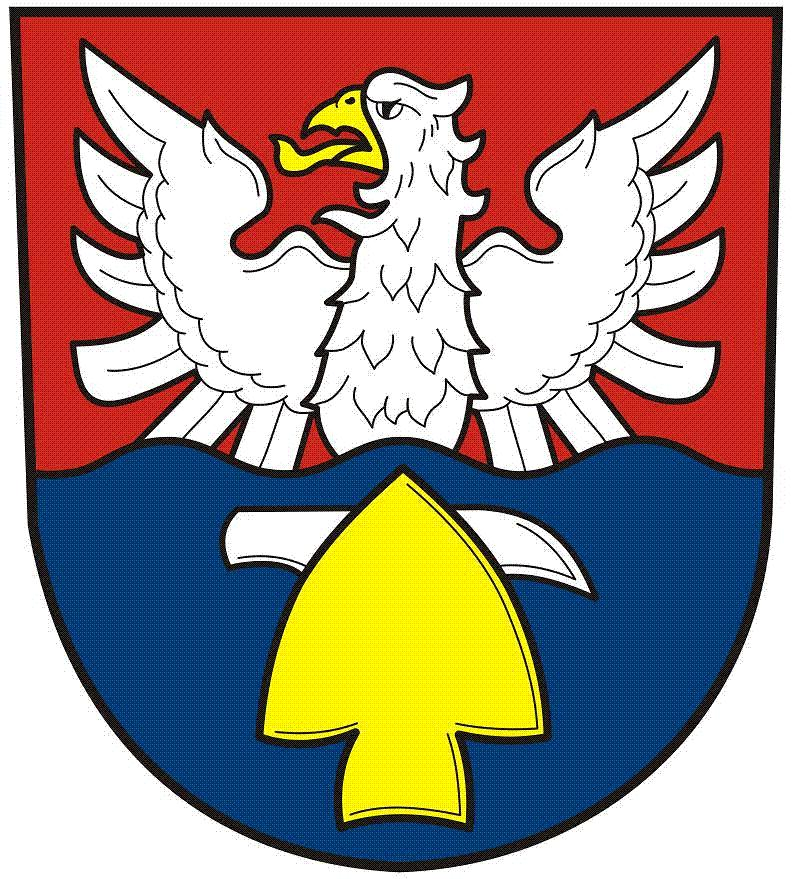
- Flag Coat of arms

- Location in the Czech Republic
- Coordinates: 48°55′10″N 14°48′27″E
- Country: Czech Republic
- Region: South Bohemian
- District: Jindřichův Hradec
- First mentioned: 1404

Area
  - Total: 35.51 km^{2} (13.71 sq mi)
- Elevation: 461 m (1,512 ft)

Population (2026-01-01)
  - Total: 205
  - Density: 5.77/km^{2} (15.0/sq mi)
- Time zone: UTC+1 (CET)
  - Summer (DST): UTC+2 (CEST)
- Postal code: 379 01
- Website: www.obeccep.cz

Cep (German: Trieschel) is a municipality and village in Jindřichův Hradec District in the South Bohemian Region of the Czech Republic. It has about 200 inhabitants.

== Etymology ==
In Czech, the name literally means 'flail', but this is just a coincidence. The name was probably derived from the word cíp ('tip'), which referred to the locality where the village was founded (a tip of land between marshes and peat bogs).

== Geography ==
Cep is located about 28 kilometres (17 mi) southwest of Jindřichův Hradec and 24 km (15 mi) east of České Budějovice. It lies in the Třeboň Basin and in the Třeboňsko Protected Landscape Area. The highest point is at 485 m (1,591 ft) above sea level. The Lužnice River flows along the eastern municipal border. There are several fishponds around the village. In the eastern part of the municipality are three flooded sand quarries known as Cep, Cep I and Cep II.

== History ==
The first written mention of Cep is from 1404. It is documented that in 1482, the village was part of the Nová Bystřice estate, owned by the Krajíř of Krajek family. Following an exchange of properties in 1508, Cep became the property of the Rosenberg family and was annexed to the Třeboň estate.

== Demographics ==
Historical population

Year	Pop.	±%
1869	495	—
1880	497	+0.4%
1890	506	+1.8%
1900	464	−8.3%
1910	518	+11.6%

Year	Pop.	±%
1921	517	−0.2%
1930	448	−13.3%
1950	328	−26.8%
1961	308	−6.1%
1970	259	−15.9%

Year	Pop.	±%
1980	194	−25.1%
1991	184	−5.2%
2001	178	−3.3%
2011	170	−4.5%
2021	158	−7.1%

Source: Censuses

== Transport ==
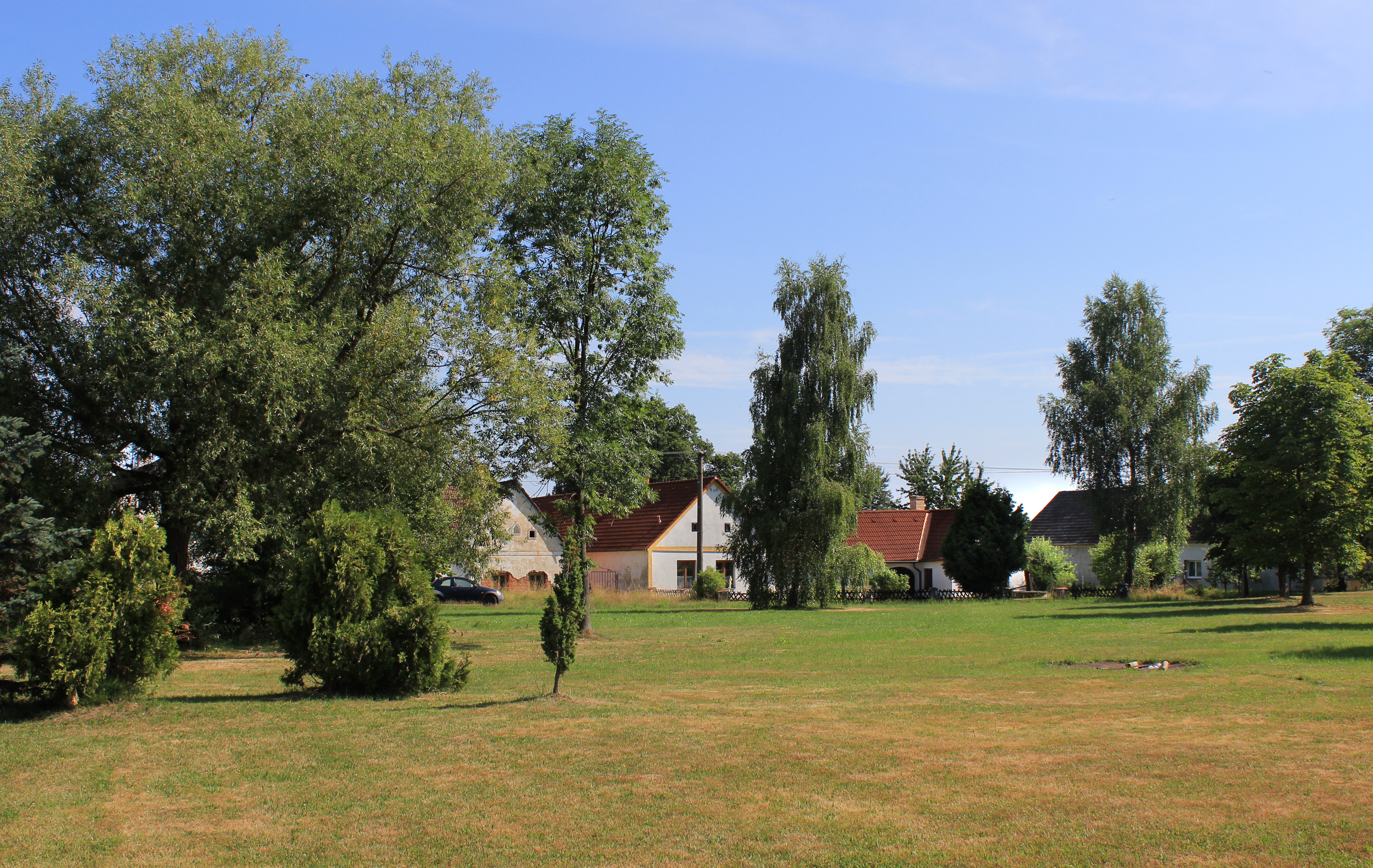
Western part of Cep

The I/24 road (which connects the D3 motorway with the Austrian–Czech border near Halámky; part of the European route E49) runs through the eastern part of the municipality.

The major international railway line Prague–Vienna runs next to the road, but there is no train station in Cep. The municipality is served by a station in neighbouring Majdalena.

== Sights ==
The pond system near Cep is part of the Rožmberk fishpond system, which is protected as a national cultural monument. Apart from the ponds, the only other protected monument is a statue of Saint Adolph dating from 1913. It was created in honour of Count Adolf Josef Schwarzenberg.

The main landmark of the centre of Cep is the Chapel of Saint John the Baptist. It was built in 1869–1871.
