= Popular Socialist Movement =

Marxist and pro-independence organization in Puerto Rico

The Popular Socialist Movement (Spanish: Movimiento Socialista Popular, MSP) was a Marxist and pro-independence organization in Puerto Rico.

The MSP was originally known as the Juventud Independentista Universitaria ("University Independence Youth", JIU) and served as the youth wing of the Puerto Rican Independence Party (PIP). The more radical JIU broke off from the Independence Party in 1974 and formed the MSP. The MSP was strongly influenced by Che Guevara and the Cuban Revolution.

In 1982, the MSP merged with the Revolutionary Socialist Party, forming the Workers' Socialist Movement (MST).
