= Filiberto Ojeda Ríos =

Puerto Rican independence activist and militant

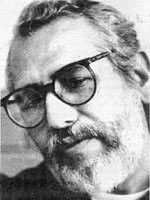
- Born: April 26, 1933; Río Blanco, Naguabo, Puerto Rico
- Died: September 23, 2005 (aged 72); Hormigueros, Puerto Rico
- Cause of death: Shot by the FBI
- Occupations: Independence activist and militant
- Organization(s): Fuerzas Armadas de Liberación Nacional Puertorriqueña; Boricua Popular Army
- Movement: Independence movement in Puerto Rico Communism

Filiberto Ojeda Ríos (April 26, 1933 – September 23, 2005) was a Puerto Rican secessionist who cofounded the Boricua Popular Army, also known as Los Macheteros, and its predecessor, the Fuerzas Armadas de Liberación Nacional Puertorriqueña (FALN). In 1990, Ojeda Ríos became a fugitive of the Federal Bureau of Investigation (FBI), wanted for his role in the 1983 Águila Blanca heist, which netted more than US$7 million (equivalent to more than $22.6 million in 2025), as well as a bail bond default on September 23 of that year. On September 23, 2005, he was killed during an exchange of gunfire with FBI agents after they surrounded the house in Hormigueros, Puerto Rico.

The FBI operation in Hormigueros was questioned by local Puerto Rican authorities as well as international organizations. The killing of Ojeda Ríos resonated throughout the Puerto Rican community around the world. In response to questions raised in media accounts and by public officials in the Commonwealth of Puerto Rico, FBI director Robert Mueller requested an investigation by the United States Department of Justice Office of the Inspector General. The resulting report concluded that "the FBI agents’ use of force in the Ojeda operation did not violate the Department of Justice Deadly Force Policy" and that Ojeda Ríos had initiated the exchange of gunfire. The Commonwealth of Puerto Rico Civil Rights Commission subsequently conducted its own investigation of the incident and issued a report on 22 September 2011 wherein the Commission called Ojeda Ríos's death an "illegal killing".

== Early life ==
Ojeda Ríos was born on April 26, 1933, in the barrio of Río Blanco in Naguabo, Puerto Rico to Inocencio Ojeda and Gloria Ríos. Ojeda Ríos entered college when he was fifteen years old and was described as having an "engaging intelligence". As a child, he played the trumpet and guitar. He joined La Sonora Ponceña, a salsa band from Ponce, Puerto Rico where he performed both instruments.

== Militant activities ==
In the 1960s, he founded the Armed Revolutionary Independence Movement, aka MIRA (Movimiento Independentista Revolucionario Armado).

The group was involved in the killing of a Puerto Rican policeman who refused to surrender his car.

The group was responsible for nearly 120 bombings in the United States between 1974 and 1983, including the 1975 bombing of the Fraunces Tavern in which four civilians were killed. On September 12, 1983, Los Macheteros stole more than US$7 million (equivalent to more than $22.6 million in 2025) from a Wells Fargo depot in West Hartford, Connecticut.

In 1989, a jury of 12 found Ojeda Ríos “innocent of all charges filed against him for shooting at FBI agents during his 1985 arrest.” He was released on bond after his attorneys successfully argued he had been denied a speedy trial, although the delay in bringing him to trial was largely the result of defense motions. On September 23, 1990, the anniversary of the Grito de Lares, Ojeda Ríos cut off the electronic tag that had been placed on his ankle as a condition of his release, and became a fugitive.

In July 1992, Ojeda Ríos was sentenced in absentia to 55 years in prison and fined $600,000 for his role in the Wells Fargo heist.

== Death ==
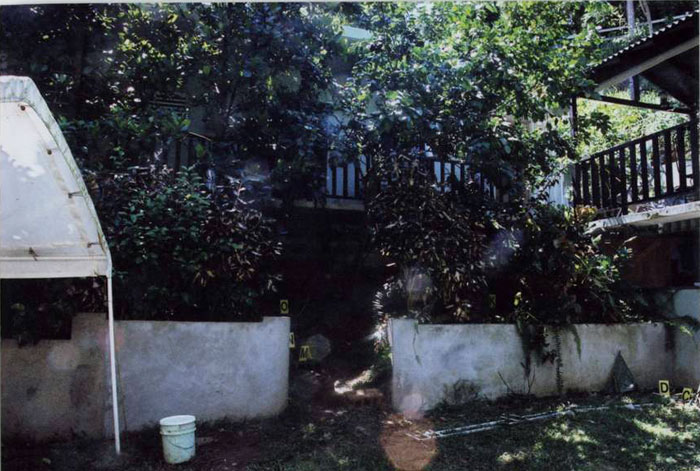
View of the front of the house, as it would have appeared to the FBI agents when they approached

On September 23, 2005, Ojeda Ríos was surrounded in his home in the outskirts of the town of Hormigueros, Puerto Rico by the FBI's Hostage Rescue Team (HRT) and fatally shot. The HRT had recently received commando training in Iraq. The FBI recounted the incident in a press release where it emphasized the participation of the San Juan field office.

According to this document, the FBI was performing surveillance of the area driven by reports that Ojeda Ríos had been spotted in the home. The FBI determined its surveillance team had been detected, and decided to proceed with serving an arrest warrant against Ojeda Ríos. As the agents approached the home, Ojeda opened fire. One agent was wounded. The official report found "this daylight assault was extremely dangerous and not the best option available to the FBI."

According to Ojeda Rios' wife, Elma Beatriz Rosado Barbosa, as well as neighbor Héctor Reyes, it was the FBI agents who initiated the shooting at 3:00 pm. The Office of the Inspector General's report stated that an FBI agent detonated a non-lethal "flash bang" grenade outside the house as a diversionary tactic when the FBI approached the house, before any gunfire began, and that Rosado may have thought this explosion was gunfire initiated by the FBI. The FBI press release stated, "as the FBI agents approached the front of the farm house at approximately 4:28 p.m., Ojeda Ríos opened the front door to the residence and opened fire on the FBI agents. In response to the gunfire from Ojeda Ríos, the FBI returned fire and established a defensive perimeter in order to contain the environment."

Rosado also alleged that Ojeda Ríos offered to turn himself in to journalist Jesús Dávila, but that his offer was rebuffed by the agents.

The Office of the Inspector General report concluded that "although the FBI utilized a negotiator from its San Juan office during the standoff, the FBI did not comply with its own policies regarding the integration of negotiators into operations planning or the use of multiple negotiators."

The FBI did not enter the house until shortly after noon the next day, at which time the agents found Ojeda Ríos dead on the floor from a single bullet wound that had punctured his lung. The report by the U.S. Department of Justice stated, "the forensic pathologist from the Puerto Rico Institute of Forensic Sciences who performed the autopsy estimated that Ojeda died from blood loss approximately 15 to 30 minutes after being shot, which would place the time of death between 6:23 p.m. and 6:38 p.m.". He was buried at Cementerio Municipal Barrio Rio Blanco in Naguabo, Puerto Rico.

== Aftermath ==
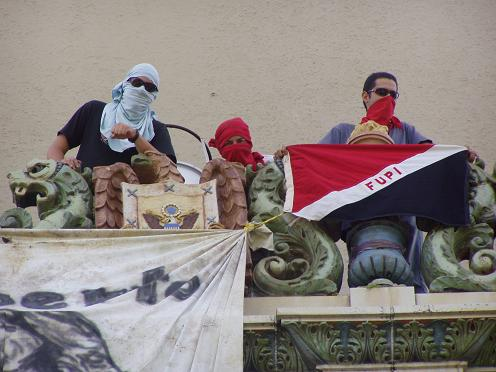
Puerto Rico Pro-Independence University Federation protesters of Ojeda Ríos' death in 2005

The report by the Puerto Rico Commission on Civil Rights states that Rodríguez Morales, one of the two forensic pathologists that performed the autopsy, declared that "as a pathologist she cannot 'say at what precise time' Ojeda Ríos died, what can be given is an estimate of the number of hours that he had been dead." She added she did not believe that a person of 72 years, who had had open heart surgery, could have survived an hour.

The FBI was criticized for failing to notify Commonwealth of Puerto Rico officials in advance of the Ojeda Ríos arrest operation by the Commission on Civil Rights, but the OIG report "determined that the FBI made the decision not to notify Puerto Rico officials of the operation because of concerns about leaks that could compromise the operation, which was a reasonable consideration under the circumstances." The report found that the "FBI missed opportunities to provide accurate information to the public and to Commonwealth officials regarding the reasons for the delay in entering Ojeda's residence" but that the delayed entry itself was justified.

Politicians across party lines in Puerto Rico criticized the handling of the event. Sitting governor Aníbal Acevedo Vilá criticized the FBI assault as "improper" and "highly irregular" and demanded to know why his government was not informed beforehand. The FBI refused to release information beyond the official press release, citing security and agent privacy issues. Three Puerto Rican members of the U.S. Congress demanded the release of more specific, and more responsive, FBI information. Amnesty International demanded an independent investigation into the possibility of "extra-judicial execution" in the case. A United Nations General Assembly Special Committee resolution labeled the killing an "assassination".

The Puerto Rico Department of Justice filed suit in federal court against the FBI and the US Attorney General, demanding information crucial to the Commonwealth's own investigation of the incident. In late March 2006, the Department sued federal authorities, including Mueller and US Attorney General Alberto Gonzales, seeking an injunction to force the federal government authorities to provide the Commonwealth government with information related to the operation in which Ojeda Ríos died, as well as another one in which the FBI searched the homes of independence supporters affiliated with Los Macheteros. A U.S. District Court judge ruled against the Puerto Rico Department of Justice. The case was subsequently appealed to a federal appeals court which ruled that "disclosing information on the Ojeda raid 'would reveal how the FBI goes about capturing a fugitive who is believed to be dangerous.'" The Commonwealth Government then took the case to the United States Supreme Court but "the Supreme Court...refused to consider [the] lawsuit by Puerto Rico seeking FBI files in the killing of Puerto Rican independence supporter Filiberto Ojeda Rios."

In response to questions raised in media accounts and by public officials in the Commonwealth of Puerto Rico, FBI Director Robert Mueller requested an investigation by the Office of the Inspector General of the United States Department of Justice. The resulting report concluded that "the FBI agents’ use of force in the Ojeda operation did not violate the Department of Justice Deadly Force Policy" and that Ojeda Ríos had initiated the exchange of gunfire. In clearing the FBI, the report found that Ojeda Ríos "clearly posed a threat to the agents" and was shot only after refusing to surrender when he was seen aiming a pistol at an agent.

== In popular culture ==
The hip hop musical group Calle 13 wrote the song "Querido FBI" ("Dear FBI"), to protest the manner of Ojeda Ríos' death at the hands of the FBI. Singer-songwriter Mikie Rivera has composed two songs inspired by Ojeda Ríos: "HF" and "Piedra y bala". In April 2018, a feature-length biographic documentary entitled Filiberto was made about him, directed by Freddie Marrero Alfonso.

== See also ==
- List of FBI controversies
- Oscar López Rivera
- Carlos Muñiz Varela
