= Tripijb =

Music band

Tripi JB is a Spanish-language heavy metal band that is based in Puerto Rico. It was founded in Madrid, and has been well known in the underground scene of Spain, New York City and Puerto Rico for over twenty years.

== Biography ==
The band was founded in Pamplona in July 1990 by bass player Manolo Serrano (Snupi), drummer Jose Joaquin Correa (Pepino) and guitar player Luis (Tripi) Vicente. They were underground musicians coming from different bands like "Chinatown" and "Kie-13" with the idea of creating a powerful Hard rock band back in Madrid, where they all resided.

They started playing in Madrid's Usera neighborhood and soon they were known for their strong language and quasi-punk shows on stage. They claimed to be influenced by Spanish heavy metal bands of the day, such as Extremoduro. (A frequent description for the band's sound is "rock puñetero", which loosely translates to "motherfucking rock".)

Two years later (1992) singer Jorge Guzman Mendez joined the band and they started playing softer hard rock music, close to Deep Purple and David Coverdale styles. In 1993 they were semi-finalists in the "Villa de Madrid" rock contest. In that same year the band performed live at Madrid's Revolver Club along the band Grass. At this instance the band recorded their first work, "JB en Revolver Club (Directo 1993)".

In 1994 the band incorporated virtuoso wild guitar player Francisco Gomez (Pako Demonio) when Tripi moved to the United States leaving a guitar vacancy. They continued to play in Madrid, leading to a much harder style, close to the style of the band Motörhead. Guzmán then left the band.

After Tripi's coming back in 1997, the band kept both guitar players, Tripi started to sing, but never played on stage. However, they recorded their first studio album "Tarde, Mal y Nunca" with little production and scarce means, but with their most famous songs (as time would prove) like "El Hijo de Puta", "Animal", and "Borratxo". After this work, Tripi permanently left Spain.

The accidental death of Snupi in an automobile accident in 1999 brought Tripi back to Spain temporarily, bringing some published old live recordings from the band: the work "los conciertos de JB". This work was edited and published in the new record label Tripirecords, and shows "never seen before" live recordings of the band from 1990 to 1992. This same year, they performed a Manolo tribute concert in the famous Vallecas Heavy metal lounge "El Killer". This concert was also recorded and published the same year "Konzierto Etíliko".

Tripi continued making studio records like "San Fermín '99" to celebrate the 10th anniversary of the band, and just one year later, Pako Demonio traveled to New York to record with Tripi another work, "Mala Yerba Nunca Muere". This record contained reflective songs about life and death and even displayed flamenco style in some of the songs.

In 2001, Tripi went back to Spain just to record the work "Konsixtente (Ruta 69)" and the very next year brought his friend Andy Toomey to perform with the band in a three concert tour around Madrid. The performances were recorded and published under the name "Kon Uno No Baxta (Doble Direzto 2002)".

=== Tripi JB ===
In 2002 Tripi, by then relocated to Yonkers, New York, gathered two North American musicians (drummer Michael Bernazzani and bassist Jimmy Verlezza) and formed TripiJB, a sequel of the JB band, with the same songs and style. They toured in New York, New Jersey and Washington, DC during two years.

=== Move to Puerto Rico ===
Tripi moved to Puerto Rico in 2003 searching for a better life and found bass player Rolando Melendez and drummer Dimas Mendez. They immediately started playing all over Puerto Rico. The year 2004 Tripirecords published three albums containing live performances in Puerto Rico where it can be appreciated the new direction of the band towards a punk rock style, closer to the first CD "Tarde Mal y Nunca".

Tripi JB recordings in Puerto Rico have been mostly live albums and individual song releases. On 2005 Tripi released a remixed, metalcore version of Calle 13's Querido F.B.I. (El Puñetero Remix), starring Tripi on guitar, which had widespread acceptance in Puerto Rico through viral marketing. A perennial crowd favorite in live shows is an eponymous ode to Toño Bicicleta.

Tripi relocated to Columbia, Missouri for two years to finish a Doctor in Philosophy degree in engineering; he soon returned to Puerto Rico, where Tripi JB still does occasional shows on hard rock venues with different lineups in the past few years most recently with Rolando Melendez on bass and Albert Davila on drums this lineup recorded a live set at San Juan club 77 that can be heard on sound cloud. Rolando left the band and no plans in the near future to resurrect the band are in effect; the band still has a very dedicated following.

== Discography ==
Recorded in Spain:

- JB en Revolver Club (Directo 1993)
- Tarde, Mal y Nunca (1998)
- los conciertos de JB (Directo 1990–92)
- Konzierto Etíliko (Live '99)
- San Fermín '99
- Mala Yerba (2000)
- Konsixtente (Ruta 69) (2001)
- Kon Uno No Baxta (Doble Direzto 2002)

Recorded in New York:

- De Gratix (2002)

Recorded in Puerto Rico:

- Direzto en Cayey (2004)
- Direzto en Aguadilla (2004)
- Directo en Moskito (2004)
