= Clean Energy Partnership =

Clean Energy Partnership (CEP) is a joint project for world's most versatile hydrogen demonstration. It is aiming for emission-free mobility and has several hydrogen stations.

As of May 2010 the CEP is a consortium of thirteen partners: Berliner Verkehrsbetriebe BVG (Berlin transit authority), BMW, Daimler, Ford, GM/Opel, Hamburger Hochbahn (Hamburg transit company), Linde Group, Royal Dutch Shell, Statoil, Total, Toyota, Vattenfall Europe, and Volkswagen Group.

== Milestones ==
In November 2004 the first hydrogen station was opened in Messedamn, Berlin, Germany. On July 13, 2006 Volkswagen Group joined the partnership.

In September, 2009 seven members of the Clean Energy Partnership signed a Memorandum of Understanding with NOW GmbH (Nationale Organisation Wasserstoff- und Brennstoffzellentechnologie, "National Organisation Hydrogen and Fuel Cell Technology", a state organisation. represented by the Federal Ministry of Transport, Building and Urban Development. It called for two phases of work

1. "leverage plans to install new hydrogen fuelling stations by 2011"
2. Depending on the progress of this, a nationwide roll-out of hydrogen fuelling stations will be continued, supporting the introduction of series produced hydrogen powered vehicles in Germany around 2015.

As of September 2006 CEP had 17 hydrogen stations.
