= Boricua Popular Army =

Puerto Rican nationalist organization

Ejército Popular Boricua – Macheteros
- Leaders: Filiberto Ojeda Ríos †; Comandante Guasábara; Juan Enrique Segarra-Palmer; Orlando González Claudio
- Dates active: 1976–2005 (armed organization); 2005–present (activist group)
- Active regions: Puerto Rico, United States
- Ideology: Puerto Rican nationalism Marxism; Anticolonialism; Anti-imperialism
- Size: Unknown
- Wars: Independence movement in Puerto Rico
- Flag

The Ejército Popular Boricua ("Boricua Popular/People's Army"), EPB also known as Los Macheteros ("The Machete Wielders"), is a clandestine militant and insurgent organization based in Puerto Rico, with cells in the broader U.S. and other nations. It campaigns for, and supports, the independence of Puerto Rico from the United States.

During their first decade of existence, they had an average of two actions per year. The group claimed responsibility for the 1978 bombing of a small power station in the San Juan area, the 1979 retaliation attacks against the United States armed forces personnel, the 1981 Muñiz Air National Guard Base attack, and a 1983 Wells Fargo bank robbery.

Boricua Popular Army was led primarily by former FBI fugitive Filiberto Ojeda Ríos until he was killed by the FBI in 2005. Ojeda Rios' killing was termed "an illegal killing" by the Government of Puerto Rico's Comisión de Derechos Civiles (Civil Rights Commission) after a seven-year investigation and a 227-page report issued on 22 September 2011.

== Ideology and operation ==
=== Political stance ===
The name Machetero was symbolically adopted from an impromptu band of Puerto Ricans who assembled to defend the island of Puerto Rico from the invading forces of the United States Army during the Spanish–American War, between July 26 and August 12, 1898. Macheteros de Puerto Rico were dispatched throughout the island, working in cooperation with other voluntary groups including the Guardias de la Paz in Yauco and Tiradores de Altura in San Juan. These voluntary units were involved in most of the battles in the Puerto Rican Campaign. Their last involvement was in the Battle of Asomante, where along with units led by Captain Hernaíz, defended Aibonito Pass from invading units. The allied offensive was effective, prompting a retreat order from the American side. However, the following morning the initial peace accords between the U.S. and Spain were made public. Subsequently, both Spanish and Puerto Rican soldiers and volunteers disengaged and Puerto Rico was annexed by the United States.

=== Hierarchy ===
As established in the EPB's "Organization of the EPB", the organization operates in a systemic and hierarchic structure. The entire organization is overseen by a central committee, which is generally focused on politics and policies. Beneath it lies a military commission, which in turn is divided by sub commissions specialized in finances, intelligence, transportation, provisions and general services and others as needed. Each commando receives additional salary, with specific exemptions being given to marriages, unemployed individuals and those with dependents. In December 1981, the EPB included benefits similar to those in the American military. The organization agreed to medical services and college education pending commission approval. New recruits may be covertly trained in rural farms or in foreign countries (Cuba being an example) and inconspicuous businesses may be used to provide cover to certain individuals. Training includes skills such as lock picking, handling firearms and explosives, forging documents, scuba diving, photography, concealment using makeup and forging license plates. An exercise regime is expected from commandoes afterwards. Meetings are kept to a minimum and only held when relevant.

=== Structure ===
The basic units are the "combat units", composed of five foot soldiers that are led by a leader with ties to the political branch. Their weapons and munitions are arbitrarily divided by type, such as short weapons and semi-automatic weapons. Rifles and shotguns are present in each unit to ensure balance. A car was also provided and used both for meetings and in incursions without attracting attention. Units in turn subscribe to specific 17-men cells, with three of the unit leaders forming the hierarchy along a pair of political and military leaders. These cells generally aim to have equipment that is comparable to the American military or law enforcement agencies. Additional support cells include trained medical personnel and are mostly in charge of logistics, maintenance, vehicles, equipment and media. Cells form 73-men formations in charge of a political member, which are assigned to specific districts and are generally independent of each other. The EPB usually plans in advance and establishes networks in places of interest, such as those in New York, Boston, Illinois, Texas and Connecticut used in the Wells Fargo heist of 1983.

=== Composition ===
For the most part, individuals affiliated with the EPB are expected to merge into general society and be as inconspicuous as possible, usually holding civilian jobs or studying, some receiving training within the United States military. A newspaper article by La Prensa stated that Michael González Cruz, a professor who published Nacionalismo Revolucionario Puertorriqueño had estimated that in 1999, there may have been 5,700 members and that in 2005, there may have been 1,100 members (excluding sympathizers).

=== Tactics ===
The group intentionally avoids any area where crime rates could result in frequent law enforcement interventions and commandos are instructed to be polite and are warned to stay away from illegal activities; association or deals with criminal organizations are prohibited. In keeping a discipline code, the organization also discourages the use of alcohol and prohibits the use of drugs. The EPB attempts to stay away from areas where other nationalist groups are based in order to avoid attention. They also settle away from military or police stations. Meetings are generally held in places with good reputation and in buildings that offer several access points, with heavy precautions being taken to reach their locations untailed. If different units are meeting, commandos are instructed to place hoods or masks and use codenames in order to protect their identities, both to accomplish plausible denial and to root out any law enforcement plant. Information is segregated between groups and only shared in limited detail, when necessary. Incriminating or detailed documents or any other evidence is to be destroyed once the potential of a law enforcement intervention is apparent. While involved in a particular mission, the EPB commandoes regularly assume a faux name, but they usually use this to acquire legitimate documents and select a nondescript address in which to receive mail in a fashion that prevents surveillance, such a P.O. Box or a decoy address where mail is delivered to the community in general. Even ammunitions were given codes such as Manteca for firearms or Libretas for explosives to conceal their nature. Armories were specifically retrofitted to preserve the condition and to prepare new ammunition as needed. Funds are managed strictly and reports are constant in order to keep a balanced budget.

== History ==
=== Early actions ===
Los Macheteros insurgency
- Part of the Puerto Rican independence movement and political violence in the United States during the Cold War
| Date | 1976–2005 |
| Location | Puerto Rico |
| Status | Stalled |

Belligerents
| United States: Puerto Rico | Ejército Popular Boricua |

Commanders and leaders
| (Puerto Rico) Rafael Hernández Colón (1976–1977) (1985–1993) (Puerto Rico) Carlos Romero Barceló (1977–1985) (Puerto Rico) Pedro Rosselló (1993–2001) (Puerto Rico) Sila María Calderón (2001–2005) | Filiberto Ojeda Ríos † Comandante Guasábara Juan Enrique Segarra-Palmer Orlando González Claudio Víctor Manuel Gerena |

Casualties and losses
| 5 killed 21 wounded | 3 killed (including Ojeda Ríos) |

The EPB was founded by Filiberto Ojeda Ríos, Juan Enrique Segarra-Palmer and Orlando González Claudio on July 26, 1976, with the date being symbolically used as a reminder of the United States invasion during the Spanish–American War.

Their first communiqué was published on August 25, 1978, following an attack on two policemen that concluded with officer Julio Rodríguez Rivera dead in retaliation for the Cerro Maravilla murders. The federal government claimed the incident was an attempt to steal his police car. On October 2, 1978, the EPB and Volunteers infiltrated an armory and took 500 pounds of ammonium nitrate, dynamite cartridges, 988 blasting caps and 17,500 feet of primacord. In September 1979, the EPB revealed that it was working in conjunction with the Volunteers, FARP and FALN.

On October 17, 1979, the groups executed eight bombings against federal buildings.

On December 3, 1979, a bus carrying 18 American Navy sailors to Naval Security Group Activity Sabana Seca, was forced to stop by a delivery truck. Shortly afterwards, four men appeared from within another vehicle and opened fire, killing CTO1 John R. Ball and RM3 Emil E. White, as well as wounding nine others. On March 13, 1980, the EPB took responsibility for attacking an ROTC vehicle that was moving three soldiers to the UPR.

=== Pitirre II ===
In the morning of January 12, 1981, a group of eleven commandos, seven guards and four explosive specialists, set explosives at Muñiz Air National Guard Base, located on the northeastern corner of the Luis Muñoz Marín International Airport in San Juan. The ensuing explosion destroyed nine aircraft (several operational A-7 Corsair II light attack aircraft and a single F-104 Starfighter supersonic fighter-interceptor aircraft being retained for a static display) and two trucks and damaged two ships on loan from the U.S. Air Force, with the authors leaving a machete behind. The destruction of the military equipment ascended to $45–50 million USD.

The FBI responded by receiving permission for a full investigation, which allowed them to employ otherwise forbidden practices to track the group. The EPB in turn expressed pride that the attack represented the most damaging to take place in American soil since Pearl Harbor and expressed satisfaction that it would attract attention to their cause, with some members even considering it a parallel to the Gaspee Affair. The group also sent a video to the media where they explained the composition of the cell in charge of the attack without revealing any identities. The security at the base was criticized in media pieces. The attack later served as the basis for upgrading base security, emphasizing flight line security, at all Air National Guard installations on civilian airports in the United States to the same level as active duty U.S. Air Force installations.

On April 21, 1981, four EPB commandos were able to extract $348,000 from a Wells Fargo armored car, with the group later noting that it would be spent in their cause. In November 1981, the EPB detonated explosives in AEE substations in Santurce, a district of San Juan. When 350 families that occupied a makeshift village in Carolina, Puerto Rico, were removed by the police, the EPB warned the governor that they would retaliate. Afterwards, they made an offensive against the police that resulted in twelve injured and one dead policeman.

On May 16, 1982, EPB members fired rifles at four sailors of the U.S.S. Pensacola, killing one of them. The group later took responsibility for the attack and expressed that it was retaliation for a large-scale amphibious attack training named "Ocean Venture '82" held at Vieques and other military facilities in Puerto Rico. Four days later, On May 20, 1982, the FBI held the EPB responsible for the placement of four defective bombs at the Caribe Hilton Hotel, with the organization denying responsibility. On September 1, 1982, a group of commandos presumed by the FBI to be Macheteros and outfitted with suppressed weapons and wearing military gear and masks, intercepted a Wells Fargo truck in a route between San Juan and Naranjito, but were unable to acquire the cargo. On November 16, 1982, four commandos feigned a heist in a supermarket to redirect those present to its warehouse until their main target, a Wells Fargo truck, arrived.Supported by more armed commandos that arrived in a van, those inside the building gained control of the armored car keys and took $300,000 from it.

=== Águila Blanca ===
On September 12, 1983, in an operation entitled Águila Blanca ("White Eagle", the nickname of José Maldonado Román) an EPB agent part of the Los Taínos cell named Víctor Manuel Gerena took over the Wells Fargo depot located in West Hartford, Connecticut, stealing a total of seven million dollars.

In 1984, Carlos Rodríguez Rodríguez was convicted on bank fraud charges and became an FBI informant in exchange for a lower sentence. However, due to the EPB's policies of anonymity, most of the information was hampered by the use of codenames and useless for the investigation. During this time, there were internal issues between Segarra and group leaders Ojeda and Avelino González, with the first being considered inefficient by the others and general concern arising from his reputation as an unfaithful husband. On January 25, 1985, the EPB detonated a bomb in an empty United States Courthouse, later noting that it was a tribute to Juan Antonio Corretjer.

Strategically, the group experienced internal divisions between a faction that argued for more offensive and another that wanted to tread lightly in order to avoid justifying the classification of terrorism. While the pacifist faction carried damage control and held two toy giveaways for Three Kings Day in Puerto Rico, Ojeda was removed from the political branch on June 4, 1985, due to these conflicts, being only left in charge of his unit. Besides the boldness of the action, the EPB strategists were also unsatisfied when Ramírez failed to account for food expenses in his report.

=== Bombings of federal buildings ===
Following the indictments against 19 members for the Águila Blanca heist, the EPB continued operations. On October 28, 1986, they joined the FARP and the Volunteers in planting eight bombs in militarily sites across Puerto Rico. Two of the bombs exploded, one outside a recruiting station in Fajardo and another outside Fort Buchanan, a partly deactivated Army base in San Juan. The EPB indicated that the explosions were a protest against the use Puerto Rico as a training center for the Contras of Nicaragua and plans to introduce a commercial logging at El Yunque National Forest park. The attacks followed the bombing of a post office in Guánica and Cidra by the Volunteers, who targeted post offices and Army recruiting stations on January 6, 1986. The Guerrilla Forces of Liberation also carried out bomb explosions in post offices, recruiting centers, and a department store to protest against the "colonial situation" of Puerto Rico during the visit of King Juan Carlos of Spain to the archipelago and island on May 25, 1987.

=== Killing of Ojeda Ríos ===
On September 23, 2005, the anniversary of "el Grito de Lares" ("The Cry of Lares") members of the FBI San Juan field office surrounded a modest home in the outskirts of the town of Hormigueros, Puerto Rico, where Ojeda Ríos was believed to be living in. The FBI claims that it was performing surveillance of the area because of reports that Ojeda Ríos had been seen in the home. In their press release, the FBI stated their surveillance team was detected, and proceeded to serve an arrest warrant against Ojeda Ríos. The FBI claims that as the agents approached the home, shots were fired from inside and outside the house wounding an FBI agent. The FBI alleges it then returned fire fatally wounding Ojeda Ríos.

A subsequent autopsy of Ojeda's body determined that he bled to death over the course of 15 to 30 minutes. The Commonwealth of Puerto Rico Civil Rights Commission started an investigation of the incident shortly after Ojeda Rios' death that lasted 7 years. The 227-page report issued on 22 September 2011 stated that Ojeda Rios's killing was "an illegal killing" by the FBI.

=== Change in guard; Comandante Guasábara ===
Following the confrontation that concluded in the death of its former leader, the command of the Boricua Popular Army was inherited by an anonymous figure known as "Comandante Guasábara", named after the Taíno word for "war". Under his leadership, the group appears to have shifted its focus towards intelligence. For example, the group has not recorded a single military action. Instead, Guasábara has generally used the media to publish classified information. Under Guasábara, the Macheteros took an emphasis on publishing pieces regarding the use of Culebra and Vieques as bombing targets for the U.S. Navy; what they perceive as a disproportionate number of military bases on the island (compared to states in the Union); the proportion of deaths within the ranks of the Independence and Nationalist leadership, including the alleged experimentation with radiation on Nationalist leader Pedro Albizu Campos while he was incarcerated; the secret testing of Agent Orange on Puerto Rican soil; and cancer "experiments" administered by Cornelius P. Rhoads, in which he claimed to have killed Puerto Rican patients and injected cancer cells to others, while working as part of a medical investigation conducted in San Juan's Presbyterian Hospital for the Rockefeller Institute.

=== Opposition to the Fortuño administration (2009–2012) ===
The Boricua Popular Army took credit for denouncing what was called "paramilitary training" that private corporation Triangle Experience Group was carrying on in the mountains of the municipality of Utuado. The media later revealed that these exercises were being done illegally, in covert fashion and lacking the required permits.

=== Opposition to the García administration (2013–2017) ===
On March 9, 2015, Commander Guasábara issued a press release where it attacked the Value Added Tax proposal (better known by its Spanish acronyms "IVA") supported by the Garcia Padilla administration as part of its response to the Puerto Rican debt crisis.

Later that month, the EPB issued a statement where they expressed the belief that a joint drill organized by Garcia Padilla's administration in collaboration with the federal government was in fact a military exercise that was organized to advance the Obama administration's campaign against the socialist government of Venezuela. Known as Operación Respuesta Borinqueña (literally "Operation Puerto Rican Response") and held March 16–21, the training was officially described as a first response practice in an emergency involving tsunamis or a chemical attack. However, Commander Guasábara expressed that a reunion held in the Dominican Republic with the official purpose of coordinating the drill was in fact a reunion between military officials of that nation, Puerto Rico and the United States, which was planned the year before with the collaboration of Venezuelan opposition leaders Carlos M. Tamayo and Carlos Fernandez (collectively known as "Los Carlos"). The Macheteros claims that the representatives of the Puerto Rico national guard protested when the topic was discussed, but the training went ahead unchanged with the supervision of several American generals, including the heads of the USNORTHCOM and USSOUTHCOM. The statement concludes by noting that the EBP's Intelligence Division had been monitoring military exercises carried out by the United States armed forces in the municipalities of Utuado and Lares, also being aware of the presence of a military helicopter in the region.

On July 11, 2015, the EPB issued another statement, this time warning that "they will do what is necessary" according to the moment's circumstances and that "the people should not pay a debt that does not belong to the people". Through its spokesman, the group anticipated that "[in its] ineptitude and impotency" the government would exploit the crisis to privatize profits and socialize losses, citing the privatization of the turnpike system, Luis Muñoz Marín International Airport, the Puerto Rico Telephone Company and the Teodoro Moscoso Bridge as previous examples of this tendency. The EBP expressed dissatisfaction in what they perceived as "an environment of indifference" within sectors of local society that "still expect magic solutions" from those responsible for the crisis, which serves as a hindrance to the militant action that they pursue. Commander Guasábara then offers an alliance that oversees previous differences. In asking the rhetoric question "What would you do for yourself, your children and your country?" the Macheteros urged the public to hold an investigation and "judge those responsible" for what they consider an "irresponsible and unnecessary debt [caused by] the corrupt administrations that we have tolerated for 50 years". The EPB concluded this press release by urging the public to "take the streets and manifest their anger in the way that they prefer", but not before stating that the time for marches was gone and that it is "time to take action".

== Classification ==
=== Local arguments ===
Supporters of independence for Puerto Rico argue that the U.S. favored the establishment of the present Commonwealth status to create a perpetual consumer base for U.S. and foreign products and services. Foreign products and services are redirected to Puerto Rico and other "unincorporated" lands of the United States to satisfy a portion of foreign trade agreements, while allowing domestic products and services a greater "home" market share. Another argument by the independence movement is that the Macheteros are continuing the historical rebellion that Puerto Ricans such as Pedro Albizu Campos and the Nationalist Party have waged, against U.S. domination of the island. It is known, for example, that Los Macheteros deliberately chose September 12 for their Águila Blanca assault on the Wells Fargo depot, because September 12 was the birthday of Puerto Rican Nationalist leader Pedro Albizu Campos. Beginning in the 1960s, the FBI infiltrated Puerto Rico's free press and political circles in order to monitor and disrupt efforts related to independence movements like Los Macheteros. This operation was part of COINTELPRO. The EPB's rebuttal to being classified as a terrorist organization is that per the definition adopted in the 1979 Conference on International Terrorism that posits "deliberate, systematic murder, maiming and menacing of the innocent to inspire fear in order to earn political gains", they do not qualify as such since their targets are strictly the American military or law enforcement and that they have never targeted civilians.

=== Federal stance ===
The FBI classifies the EPB as a terrorist organization based on their definition of the term, "[the use of] force or violence [...] in furtherance of political or social objectives", without specification on the target. In 1982, the Senate Subcommittee on the Administration of Internal Security Act compiled a paper titled "The Cuban Connection to Puerto Rican Terrorism" where it claimed that Ojeda was an agent of the Cuban government and in which the FBI knowing where he operated. After the application of the Levi guidelines, only eight groups were classified as requiring full investigation. Of them, five were based in Puerto Rico and besides the EPB also included the FARP, FALN, COR and MLN. In 2001, then-FBI Director Louis J. Freeh reaffirmed the agency's historical stance that the group committed acts of terrorism.

=== Other assessments ===
In his book Los Macheteros: The Wells Fargo Robbery and the Violent Struggle for Puerto Rican Independence, Spanish-American author Ronald Fernández argued that based on the descriptions of terrorism and revolutionary violence in books like Benjamin Netanyahu's Terrorism: How the West can Win or Albert Camus' The Rebel, the EPB would not be classified as a terrorist organization, since that would require them to target "anyone except soldiers" and the use of fear as a tactic. Whereas, the organization's target selection, namely the U.S. military/federal government and the avoidance of civilians fits into the classification of a guerrilla or revolutionary group. The author does not condone violence, but uses Camus' argument on "necessary" rebel violence as inexcusable but still "historically necessary". To this end, Fernández identifies that from the EPB's point of view, the deaths at Sabana Seca were "terrible but necessary" despite personally disagreeing, while considering the destruction of military vehicles at Sabana Seca justified from a rebel's standpoint. Ultimately, the author concludes that such labeling could be of political convenience to the federal government, serving to "shift the blame for any attacks on U.S. policy or personnel from us to them".

== Cultural impact ==
=== In art and film ===
An 80-minute fictional film about a Puerto Rican from New York City who declares himself a self styled machetero, titled MACHETERO, was released in 2008. Starring Not4Prophet (Ricanstruction, X-Vandals, Abrazos Army), as Pedro Taíno, and Isaach De Bankolé (Casino Royale, Ghostdog, Black Panther), as French journalist Jean Dumont, the film takes place in both New York City and Puerto Rico. Other actors include Kelvin Fernández (first starring role) and professed former political prisoner, Dylcia Pagán. The film was the winner of the 2008 South Africa International Film Festival, 2009 Swansea Film Festival, 2009 Heart of England Film Festival, 2009 International Film Festival Thailand, and the 2009 International Film Festival Ireland.

The Macheteros are briefly referenced in the 1994 film Clear and Present Danger, in which Colonel Félix Cortez is described as having worked with several militant organizations, including the group.

The first single published by band Calle 13 was "Querido FBI", which was extra-officially released before their debut album, a response to the events of September 23, 2005. It is a protest song, directly addressing the circumstances surrounding the death of Ojeda Ríos. A song was also released by the Hip Hop group, X-Vandals (Not4Prophet and DJ Johnny Juice) entitled Todos Somos Machetero in 2007.

Likewise, the event led to the creation of murals. Some were painted by student movements such as one at UPR Río Piedras, whereas others were painted by urban artists.

=== Other depictions ===
The polarizing nature of the organization have also been exploited in the local professional wrestling industry by wrestlers such as Israel "Joseph RPM" Rodríguez, who integrated the moniker of "El Machetero Mayor" (Spanish for "The Grandest Machetero") into his ring name and performed as such throughout Puerto Rico as a member of several independent promotions and the World Wrestling League.

== Notable group members ==
| Name | Role and hierarchy |
|---|---|
| Filiberto Ojeda Ríos | Co-founder Former leader |
| Juan Enrique Segarra-Palmer | Co-founder |
| Víctor Manuel Gerena | Inside man for Águila Blanca |
| Comandante Guasábara | General Subsecretary; Current leader |

== See also ==
- Congress in Solidarity with Puerto Rico's Independence
- Farabundo Martí National Liberation Front
- Guatemalan National Revolutionary Unity
- Sandinista National Liberation Front
- Zapatista Army of National Liberation

== Bibliography ==
- Fernández, Ronald (1987). Los Macheteros: The Wells Fargo robbery and the violent struggle for Puerto Rican independence. Prentice Hall. ISBN 0135406005.
