= Puerto Rican Workers' Revolutionary Party =

Far-left group in Puerto Rico

The Puerto Rican Workers' Revolutionary Party (Spanish: Partido Revolucionario de los Trabajadores Puertorriqueños, PRTP or PRTP-Macheteros) is a far-left political party in Puerto Rico.

The PRTP was formed in 1976, and in 1978 founded the Boricua Popular Army (EPB, more commonly known as the Macheteros, lit. 'machete wielders') as a mass organization. The EPB broke off from the PRTP in 1984.

The PRTP is affiliated with the Socialist Front.
