= Lactocepin =

Identifiers
- EC no.: 3.4.21.96
- CAS no.: 205510-58-3

Databases
- IntEnz: IntEnz view
- BRENDA: BRENDA entry
- ExPASy: NiceZyme view
- KEGG: KEGG entry
- MetaCyc: metabolic pathway
- PRIAM: profile
- PDB structures: RCSB PDB PDBe PDBsum
Search
- PMC: articles
- PubMed: articles
- NCBI: proteins

Lactocepin (EC 3.4.21.96, CEP, extracellular lactococcal proteinase, lactococcal cell wall-associated proteinase, lactococcal cell envelope-associated proteinase, lactococcal proteinase, PrtP) is an enzyme. This enzyme catalyses the following chemical reaction

Endopeptidase activity with very broad specificity, although some subsite preferences have been noted, e.g. large hydrophobic residues in the P1 and P4 positions, and Pro in the P2 position [1,2]. Best known for its action on caseins, although it has been shown to hydrolyse hemoglobin and oxidized insulin B chain

This enzyme is associated with the cell envelope of Lactococcus lactis and attached via a C-terminal membrane anchor sequence.
