= Toño Bicicleta =

Puerto Rican criminal (1943–1995)

Antonio García López ("Toño Bicicleta")
- Born: July 19, 1943; Puerto Rico^{[note a]}
- Died: November 29, 1995 (aged 52); Lares, Puerto Rico
- Cause of death: Gunshot wounds
- Occupation: Farmer
- Status: Deceased
- Criminal charges: Murder, kidnapping
- Penalty: Life imprisonment from 1968

Francisco Antonio García López (July 19, 1943 – November 29, 1995), also known as Toño Bicicleta (literally, "Tony Bicycle" in English), was a Puerto Rican criminal who gained notoriety for escaping from prison several times. García López managed to become part of Puerto Rican folklore and the object of constant references in popular culture. His escapes became legendary in Puerto Rico.

== Biography ==
There are conflicting versions as to García López's birthplace. The police file states that he was born in Yauco, Puerto Rico, but journalist and writer Alexis Morales Cales who specialized in the criminal's life, believes he was born in Maricao, specifically in the Indiera Alta barrio. Others still believe he was born in Lares....

García's parents were Esteban García Medina and Antonia López Vargas. There are conflicting stories regarding how he came to be known as Toño Bicicleta: one, because he was said to get around on an old bicycle, and the other, because he stole a bike in his youth.

García's first wife was called Antonia Rivera. They had three children together: Francisco Antonio, María Milagros, and Carmen Dolores.

=== Criminal history ===
According to the police investigation, in 1968 Antonio García murdered his then wife, Gloria Soto, with a machete. For this crime, García was sentenced to 185 years in prison. However, he managed to escape two years later.

In 1974, García was again captured by a civilian in a farm in the Guaraguao barrio of Ponce. He was incarcerated in the prison of Sabana Hoyos in Arecibo, until 1981 when he escaped again. In 1984, he broke in the house of Gilberto Pérez Valentín, mayor of the town of Maricao. According to Pérez, García stole some silver coins, food, a machete, a flashlight, and a Smith & Wesson .45 caliber gun.

García's numerous escapes helped him become part of the local lore. Allegedly, during his escapes he would continue committing rapes and kidnappings. Some of the women that were allegedly kidnapped by García during the 1970s were Luz Celenia Caraballo and Aurea Esther Camacho. In 1981, García kidnapped Olga Iris Despiau Cabán from her home in Arecibo. According to Despiau, García threatened to kill her father with a knife if she didn't comply. She remained with the fugitive until 1984, when he abandoned her during a raid. Some time later, García kidnapped her a second time until her family managed to rescue her. He also tried to kidnap Luz Delia Soler during the late 1980s. Some people claim that due to his notoriety he was used as some sort of scapegoat both by authorities and civilians to several crimes on the island.

In 1987, García killed his stepfather, Antonio Caraballo Gonzales, and then tried to burn the body. After that, his mother Antonia Garcia was able to flee from the crime scene. Then he killed his uncle, Pablo López Vargas, in Maricao. On January 31, 1988, García killed Luis Rodríguez and kidnapped his 14-year-old girlfriend, Dahiana Pérez Lebrón. The girl stayed with the criminal for eight years during which he raped her and forced her to sleep with her feet chained. Dahiana was with him at the moment of his last showdown with authorities in 1995.

=== Death and burial ===
In the morning of November 29, 1995, García was allegedly working in a coffee plantation in the Castañer ward of Lares, Puerto Rico. Police arrived at 7:20 am and Officer Luis Rosa Merced of the Puerto Rico Police Department shot the notorious criminal in the genitals. According to the police report, García resisted the arrest and tried to attack Rosa with a machete. As he threw himself to the ground, he shot García, fatally injuring him. According to Dahiana Pérez, García did not die immediately, but was kicked and mocked by the officers while he bled to death.

At the time of his death, García was described as being 5 feet 2 inches and weighing 130 pounds. His funeral was held at Irizarry Funeral Home in Lares, and his body was buried in that town's cemetery. Despite the fact that he was a criminal, assassin and rapist, and some welcomed his death, thousands of people attended his funeral. He had become a kind of legend because of his constant appearance, during a 14-year period, in El Vocero, Puerto Rico's popular newspaper, at the time.

== References in popular culture ==
- In 1978, Puerto Rican Salsa band Rubby Haddock y su Orquesta released the song "Toño Bicicleta" on the album La Leyenda.
- In 1978, French writer Georges Londreix, who had been living in Puerto Rico during the 1970s and was the director of the local chapter of the Alliance Francaise, edited Tonio Bicicleta, a novel about García López written in French. It was subsequently translated to Spanish.
- In the early 1970s, Tony Croatto, then paired with his sister Nelly, had a minor pop music hit in Puerto Rico titled "La Bicicleta de Toño" ("Toño's Bicycle").
- In the early 1990s, local rock band La Mancha del Jardín released a song titled "Toño Bicicleta".
- In the early 1990s, local rock band Puya mentioned Toño Bicicleta in their song "El Chupacabra".
- A different song named "Toño Bicicleta" was recorded by Spanish-Puerto Rican thrash metal band Juerguistas y Borrachos.
- In the late 1990s, a local film titled La Noche Que Se Apareció Toño Bicicleta (The Night that Toño Bicicleta Appeared) was released.
- In 2007, the Calle 13 song "La Crema" on the album Residente o Visitante makes reference to Toño Bicicleta as part of a laundry list of Puerto Rican culture and lore.
- A diss track towards Tego Calderón called "Wasa Wasa" by Puerto Rican rapper Temperamento, makes reference to Toño Bicicleta on the following verse "Aguanta esa boca tienes los cachetes llenos de coca, tu si que eres feca, eres tan horrible que ni Toño te prestaba la Bicicleta". Put up with that mouth, your cheeks are full of coke, you really are fake, you are so horrible that not even Toño would lend you the Bicycle."
- In the song "Dale Pal Piso" of Watussi Ft. Jowell & Randy and Ñengo Flow, It refers to "Toño Bicicleta".

== See also ==
- List of Puerto Ricans

== Notes ==
1.There's disagreement among authorities as to the precise town within Puerto Rico where García López was born. Some state he was born in Yauco, others say it was in Maricao. Still others say in Lares. See article for more details.
