= List of members of the United States Congress killed or wounded in office =

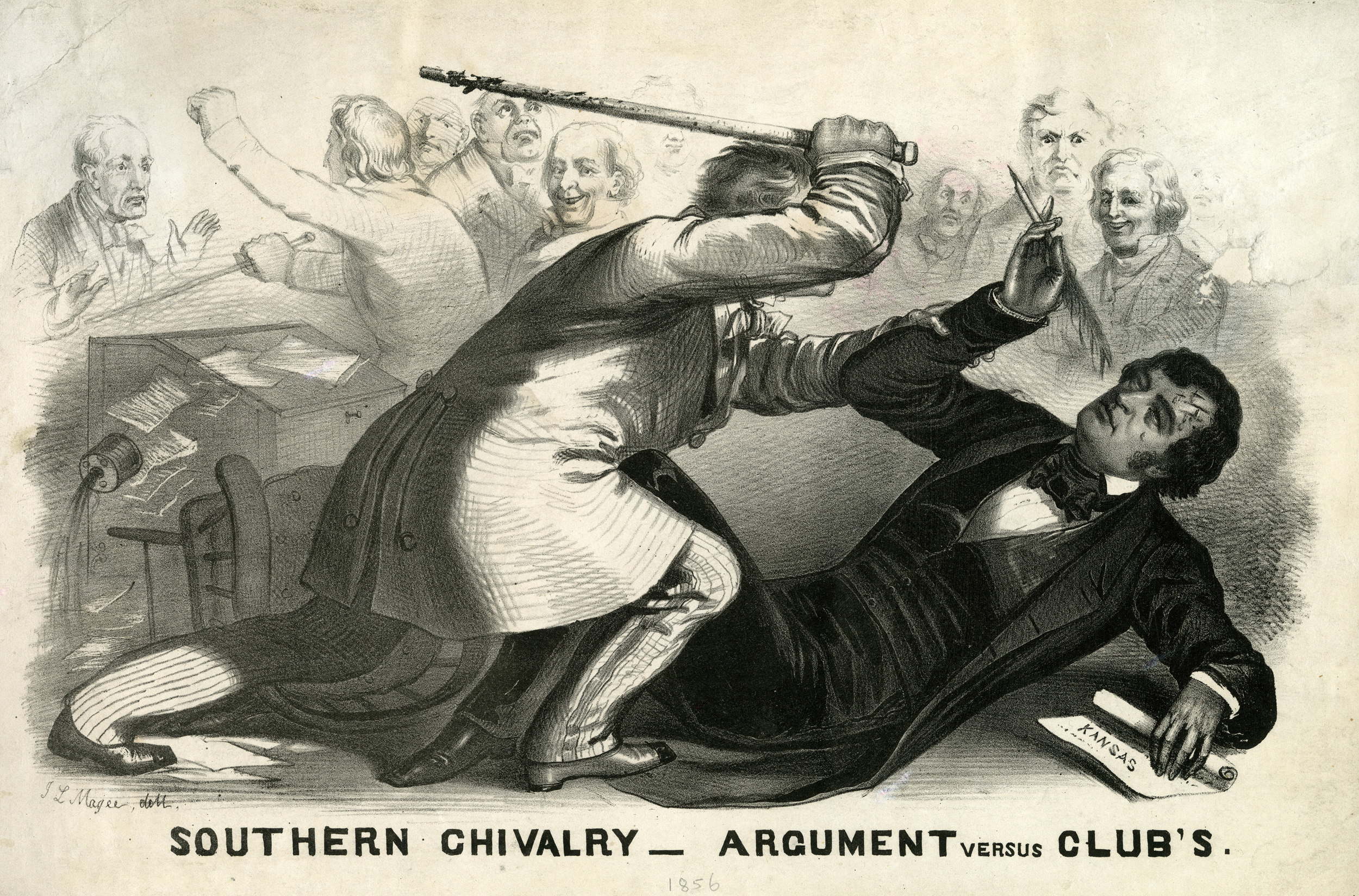
John L. Magee's lithography demonstrating Northern outrage over Preston Brooks's attack on Charles Sumner

Since the United States Congress was established with the 1st Congress in 1789, fourteen of its members have been killed while in office, and eighteen have suffered serious injuries from attacks. The members of Congress were either injured or killed by someone intending serious harm, or there is speculation of lethal intent by an unknown assailant (such as the two congressmen who died of the National Hotel disease). The first member of Congress to be killed or wounded in office was Henry Wharton Conway who was killed in a duel in 1827. The most recent death occurred in 1983 when Korean Air Lines Flight 007, carrying Larry McDonald, was shot down over the Pacific Ocean. The most recent member of Congress to be injured was Maxwell Frost who was assaulted in 2026.

All of the 14 members of Congress killed in office were male and 10 were Democrats, three were Republicans, and one was a Democratic-Republican. Four members died in duels, and a total of ten (three senators, six members of the House of Representatives, and one territory delegate to the House) died from gunshot wounds.

Nineteen members of Congress have been wounded while in office. Eight of the wounded were Republicans, seven were Democrats, two were Anti-Jacksonian, and there is one member each from the Democratic-Republican Party and Whig Party. Two were women, and three were senators. Five of those injured were wounded during the 1954 United States Capitol shooting incident.

== Killed ==
Party colors: Democratic-Republican Democratic Republican

Member		State (district)	Date of incident	Perpetrator(s)	Cause	Incident
Henry Wharton Conway	Henry Wharton Conway	Arkansas Territory (At-large delegate)	October 29, 1827	Robert Crittenden	Duel	Died 11 days after being shot in the chest during a duel with Robert Crittenden near the confluence of the White and Mississippi rivers
Spencer Darwin Pettis		Missouri (1st at-large seat)	August 28, 1831	Thomas Biddle	Duel	Both Pettis and Thomas Biddle sustained fatal gunshot wounds during a duel on Bloody Island in Illinois.
Jonathan Cilley	Jonathan Cilley	Maine (3rd district)	February 24, 1838	William Graves	Duel	Shot by William Graves, the Whig Congressman from Kentucky's 8th district, during a duel on the Marlboro Pike in Maryland
John Gallagher Montgomery		Pennsylvania (12th district)	April 24, 1857	Unknown (disputed)	Likely dysentery, theorized by some to be poisoning (disputed)	Several people staying at the National Hotel in Washington, D.C., died of National Hotel disease during this time period. Though at the time there were theories that someone had poisoned the hotel guests, 21st century medical experts attribute the outbreak to "dysentery because of the hotel’s primitive sewage system."
John A. Quitman	John Quitman	Mississippi (5th district)	July 17, 1858	Unknown (disputed)	Likely dysentery, theorized by some to be poisoning (disputed)	Several people staying at the National Hotel in Washington, D.C., died of National Hotel disease during this time period. Though at the time there were theories that someone had poisoned the hotel guests, 21st century medical experts attribute the outbreak to "dysentery because of the hotel’s primitive sewage system."
David Colbreth Broderick	David Broderick	California (Senator)	September 13, 1859	David Terry	Duel	Broderick and David Terry, the Chief Justice of the Supreme Court of California, took part in a duel in San Francisco. Broderick was shot and died three days later.
Edward Dickinson Baker	Edward Baker	Oregon (Senator)	October 21, 1861	7th Brigade, 4th Division of the Confederate Army of the Potomac (under the command of Nathan Evans)	Battle	Died during the Battle of Ball's Bluff, while assigned command of a brigade in Brigadier General Charles Pomeroy Stone's division, guarding fords along the Potomac River in Virginia. The Confederate soldiers were commanded by Brigadier General Nathan George Evans.
Cornelius S. Hamilton		Ohio (8th district)	December 22, 1867	Thomas Hamilton	Murder	Killed by his insane 18-year-old son, Thomas, in Marysville, Ohio
James M. Hinds		Arkansas (2nd district)	October 22, 1868	George Clark	Assassination	Killed in Indian Bays in Monroe County, Arkansas, after being shot in the back by George A. Clark, a member of the Ku Klux Klan and the secretary of the Democratic committee of the county
John M. Pinckney	John Pinckney	Texas (8th district)	April 24, 1905	Unknown (riot started by J. N. Brown)	Mass shooting	A political event in Hempstead, Texas, turned violent when one of the participants, J. N. Brown, began shooting. Other attendees began to shoot as well and a riot broke out. Pinckney, his brother Tom, and Brown were all killed at the scene.
Huey Long	Huey Long	Louisiana (Senator)	September 8, 1935	Carl Weiss (possibly)	Assassination	Died two days after Weiss fired a handgun at him at close range inside the Louisiana State Capitol in Baton Rouge
Robert F. Kennedy	Robert F. Kennedy	New York (Senator)	June 5, 1968	Sirhan Sirhan	Assassination	Shot at the Ambassador Hotel in Los Angeles after giving his victory speech in the California primary; he died about 25 hours later.
Leo Ryan	Leo Ryan	California (11th district)	November 18, 1978	Peoples Temple (under the direction of Jim Jones)	Mass shooting	While on an official visit to Guyana to investigate the activities of the Peoples Temple group led by Jim Jones, Ryan was shot multiple times while boarding an airplane leaving Jonestown.
Larry McDonald	Larry McDonald	Georgia (7th district)	September 1, 1983	Soviet Far East District Air Defense Forces	Aircraft shootdown	McDonald was a passenger on board Korean Air Lines Flight 007 which was shot down over the Sea of Japan near Sakhalin island by Soviet interceptors piloted by Major Gennadiy Osipovich on the orders of General Anatoly Kornukov, Commander of Sokol Air Base.

== Wounded ==
Party colors: Democratic-Republican Party Anti-Jacksonian Whig Democratic Republican

Member		State (district)	Date of incident	Perpetrator(s)	Cause	Incident
Matthew Lyon	Matthew Lyon	Vermont (1st district)	February 15, 1798	Roger Griswold	Assault	Lyon spit tobacco juice at Griswold on January 30th and after the House refused to expel Lyon, Griswold caned Lyon on the house floor. Lyon used a pair of fire tongs to defend himself.
William Stanbery	William Stanberry	Ohio (8th district)	April 13, 1832	Sam Houston	Assault	After Stanbery accused Sam Houston of profiteering off Andrew Jackson's forced relocation of Native Americans, Houston confronted Stanbery in Washington, D.C., and beat him repeatedly with a hickory walking stick. During the fight Stanbery pulled a gun, placed it on Houston's chest, and pulled the trigger, but the gun misfired.
Thomas Dickens Arnold	-	Tennessee (2nd district)	May 20, 1832	Morgan A. Heard	Assassination attempt	Arnold verbally blasted Sam Houston for his assault of William Stanbery. A friend of Houston's, Morgan A. Heard, attacked Arnold as he descended the steps of the Capitol, initially attempting to club him. After failing to club him, Heard drew a sawed-off dueling pistol and fired one shot, grazing Arnold's shoulder. Arnold then proceeded to beat Heard and was preparing to spear him when Arnold was disarmed by Congressman Joseph Duncan.
Alexander H. Stephens	Alexander H. Stephens	Georgia (8th district)	September 4, 1848	Francis H. Cone	Assault	Francis Cone, an Associate Justice of the Georgia Supreme Court, called Stephens a "traitor to the South" due to Stephens's move to table the Clayton Compromise. When confronted about this in front of Atlanta's Thompson Hotel, Stephens struck Cone with his walking stick and Cone responded by stabbing Stephens six times in the hand and chest.
Charles Sumner	Charles Sumner	Massachusetts (Senator)	May 22, 1856	Preston Brooks	Assault	Representative Preston Brooks, a Democrat from South Carolina's 4th district, assaulted Sumner with a cane on the floor of the Senate in the Capitol Building in Washington, D.C. The attack followed Sumner's verbal attacks on pro-slavery politicians (including Brooks's relative, Senator Andrew Butler).
Charles H. Van Wyck	Charles H. Van Wyck	New York (10th district)	February 22, 1861	Three unknown assailants	Assassination attempt	Van Wyck had been receiving death threats since a March 1860 speech on the House floor where he denounced Democratic support of slavery. Almost a year later, as he was walking past the Capitol Building, he was attacked by three successive assailants, at least two wielding bowie knives. Van Wyck was stabbed in the chest, but protected by a copy of the Congressional Globe in his breast pocket, and received knife wounds to his hand. Van Wyck shot one of the assailants before being knocked unconscious.
William D. Kelley	William D. Kelley	Pennsylvania (4th district)	January 22, 1865	Alexander P. Field	Assault	Field, a would-be delegate of Louisiana as it was being readmitted to the union, assaulted Kelley with a penknife after a heated exchange in the Willard Hotel. Kelley was stabbed in the hand, which he had raised in self defense. Field was not admitted to Congress due to the assault.
Josiah B. Grinnell	Josiah Grinnell	Iowa (4th district)	June 14, 1866	Lovell Rousseau	Assault	Grinnell was assaulted with an iron-tipped cane by Lovell Rousseau, an Unconditional Unionist Congressman from Kentucky's 7th district, on the east portico of the Capitol Building in Washington, D.C., in retaliation for derogatory statements he made earlier. Grinnell was pummeled on the "head and face until the cane broke," and was heavily bruised.
Alvin Morell Bentley	Alvin Bentley	Michigan (8th district)	March 1, 1954	Rafael Cancel Miranda, Andres Figueroa Cordero, Irvin Flores, Lolita Lebrón	Mass shooting	1954 Capitol shooting: Armed Puerto Rican nationalists shot the representatives from the Ladies Gallery of the House of Representatives in the Capitol Building in Washington, D.C.
Clifford Davis	Clifford Davis	Tennessee (10th district)	March 1, 1954	Rafael Cancel Miranda, Andres Figueroa Cordero, Irvin Flores, Lolita Lebrón	Mass shooting	1954 Capitol shooting: Armed Puerto Rican nationalists shot the representatives from the Ladies Gallery of the House of Representatives in the Capitol Building in Washington, D.C.
George Hyde Fallon	George Fallon	Maryland (4th district)	March 1, 1954	Rafael Cancel Miranda, Andres Figueroa Cordero, Irvin Flores, Lolita Lebrón	Mass shooting	1954 Capitol shooting: Armed Puerto Rican nationalists shot the representatives from the Ladies Gallery of the House of Representatives in the Capitol Building in Washington, D.C.
Ben F. Jensen	Ben Jensen	Iowa (7th district)	March 1, 1954	Rafael Cancel Miranda, Andres Figueroa Cordero, Irvin Flores, Lolita Lebrón	Mass shooting	1954 Capitol shooting: Armed Puerto Rican nationalists shot the representatives from the Ladies Gallery of the House of Representatives in the Capitol Building in Washington, D.C.
Kenneth A. Roberts	Kenneth Roberts	Alabama (4th district)	March 1, 1954	Rafael Cancel Miranda, Andres Figueroa Cordero, Irvin Flores, Lolita Lebrón	Mass shooting	1954 Capitol shooting: Armed Puerto Rican nationalists shot the representatives from the Ladies Gallery of the House of Representatives in the Capitol Building in Washington, D.C.
John C. Stennis	John Stennis	Mississippi (Senator)	January 29, 1973	Tyrone Marshall, John Marshall, Derrick Holloway	Mugging	Stennis was shot twice outside his home in Washington, D.C., during a mugging.
Gabby Giffords	Gabrielle Giffords	Arizona (8th district)	January 8, 2011	Jared Lee Loughner	Mass shooting	Giffords was shot in the head during the 2011 Tucson mass shooting, an assassination attempt on Giffords which occurred at a constituency meeting held in a supermarket parking lot in Casas Adobes, Arizona.
Steve Scalise	Steve Scalise	Louisiana (1st district)	June 14, 2017	James T. Hodgkinson III	Mass shooting	Scalise was shot in the hip by a gunman targeting and firing indiscriminately upon the Republican congressional delegation, during a practice session for the 2017 Congressional Baseball Game at the Eugene Simpson Stadium Park in Alexandria, Virginia.
Rand Paul	Rand Paul	Kentucky (Senator)	November 3, 2017	Rene Boucher	Assault	Paul was tackled from behind by his neighbor, Rene Boucher, during a dispute over yard waste. Paul sustained five fractured ribs, including three displaced fractures, as well as "cuts around his mouth."
Angie Craig	Angie Craig	Minnesota (2nd district)	February 9, 2023	Kendrick Hamline	Assault	Craig was punched and grabbed by the neck by Kendrick Hamline in the elevator of her Washington, D.C., apartment. Craig defended herself from Hamline and sustained cuts and bruising.
Maxwell Frost	Maxwell Frost	Florida (10th district)	January 23, 2026	Christian Joel Young	Assault	Frost was punched in the face at a private event during the Sundance Film Festival in Park City, Utah, by a man who reportedly made racist remarks and told him President Donald Trump would deport him before the attack; the assailant was arrested and charged in connection with the incident.

== Intracongressional violence ==
Joanne B. Freeman documents in her 2018 book The Field of Blood: Violence in Congress and the Road to Civil War the dozens of violent skirmishes that broke out in the United States Congress between members in the lead up to the American Civil War. Freeman states that between 1830 and 1860 there were over 70 instances of violence between congress members. Freeman also notes that the two publications of record at the time, the National Intelligencer and the Daily Globe, often scrubbed fights out of the official record making it tough to learn of every moment of violence on the House and Senate floor. For instance, a fist fight might be described as "an altercation of angry and personal character" instead of an act of violence.

This period of exceptionally high violence saw single days of heavy violence including three fights breaking out on March 4, 1849, all of which had a southerner assaulting a northerner. The first eight weeks of the 36th United States Congress saw nine fights with six of them pitting Democrats versus Republicans.

Over this period violence was also focused around certain individuals in Congress. Joshua Giddings, an abolitionist from Ohio, attacked at least seven times by slave holding congress members,, and Henry S. Foote took part in four duels getting injured in three of them. Additionally, Hinton Rowan Helper the author of The Impending Crisis of the South: How to Meet It had a fistfight with Francis Burton Craige in the house while armed with a knife and a gun,

The below list documents moments of violence between Congress members where there was more than one belligerent and at least one member got substantially hurt.

Party colors: Democratic-Republican Party Anti-Jacksonian Whig Democratic Republican

Belligerents			Date of incident	Incident	Ref.
Clement Claiborne Clay	Clement Claiborne Clay	Alabama (Senator)	1860	Clay and Clingman came to blows in the Senate chamber over "charges surrounding the presidential campaign of Stephen Douglas." Clingman got a black eye in the scuffle.	
Thomas L. Clingman	Thomas L. Clingman	North Carolina (Senator)	1860	Clay and Clingman came to blows in the Senate chamber over "charges surrounding the presidential campaign of Stephen Douglas." Clingman got a black eye in the scuffle.	
Henry A. Wise	Henry A. Wise	Virginia (8th district)	1841	The "great fight" of 1841 erupted when Wise punched Stanly after an exchange of insults. A "wild melee" broke out where "nearly all the members" get involved in fighting each other.	
Edward Stanly	Edward Stanly	North Carolina (3rd district)	1841	The "great fight" of 1841 erupted when Wise punched Stanly after an exchange of insults. A "wild melee" broke out where "nearly all the members" get involved in fighting each other.	
George Jones	George Jones	Tennessee (5th district)	1848	Jones and Haralson had a fist fight on the floor of Congress where they "flipped a desk and started slugging each other."	
Hugh Haralson	-	Georgia (4th district)	1848	Jones and Haralson had a fist fight on the floor of Congress where they "flipped a desk and started slugging each other."	
Henry Foote	Henry Foote	Mississippi (Senator)	-	Foote and Davis took part in a fistfight.	
Jefferson Davis	Jefferson Davis	Mississippi (Senator)	-	Foote and Davis took part in a fistfight.	
Henry Foote	Henry Foote	Mississippi (Senator)	-	Foote and Cameron took part in a fistfight.	
Simon Cameron	Simon Cameron	Pennsylvania (Senator)	-	Foote and Cameron took part in a fistfight.	
Henry Foote	Henry Foote	Mississippi (Senator)	-	Foote and Borland took part in a fistfight over John C. Calhoun's politics	
Solon Borland	Solon Borland	Arkansas (Senator)	-	Foote and Borland took part in a fistfight over John C. Calhoun's politics	
Galusha Grow	Galusha Grow	Pennsylvania (14th district)	February 06, 1858	Grow and Keitt began thowing insults at each other before erupting in blows. A melee erupted with more than thirty Congress members joining in on the fight.	
Laurence Keitt	Laurence Keitt	South Carolina (3rd district)	February 06, 1858	Grow and Keitt began thowing insults at each other before erupting in blows. A melee erupted with more than thirty Congress members joining in on the fight.	

== See also ==
- List of assassinated American politicians
- List of United States federal judges killed in office
- List of United States presidential assassination attempts and plots
- Threatening government officials of the United States
- Members of the United States Congress who died in office
