= Order of Playa Girón =

National order conferred by the Council of State of Cuba

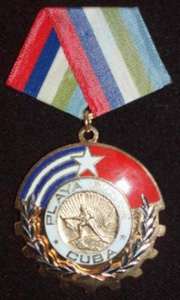
- The Order of Playa Girón
- Type: Single-grade order
- Presented by: the Republic of Cuba
- Eligibility: Citizens of Cuba, foreigners
- First award: 1961
- Ribbon bar of the order

The Order of Playa Girón is a national order conferred by the Council of State of Cuba on Cubans or foreigners. It was established in 1961 and is named after the Playa Girón (Girón beach), site of the Cuban victory in the Bay of Pigs Invasion.

== Description ==
The order takes the form of a gold medal with pin and ribbon. The obverse of the medal depicts a soldier in fighting attitude, with one foot on the Cuban archipelago and the other on the North American mainland. Earlier versions included the Cuban motto, "Patria o Muerte" (Homeland or Death), while later versions include the Cuban colours above, a wreath below, and the words "Orden Playa Girón" (Order of Playa Girón). The reverse depicts the coat of arms of Cuba and the wording "Consejo de Estado" and "República de Cuba" (Council of State, Republic of Cuba).

== Recipients ==
=== Overview ===
The first recipient was the cosmonaut Yuri Gagarin, who travelled to Cuba to receive the award on 26 July 1961, the Day of the National Rebellion, from President Osvaldo Dorticos, just over three months after becoming the first human in space.

All recipients of the Hero of the Republic of Cuba also receive the Order of Playa Girón. Recipients have included prominent international figures including Leonid Brezhnev, Yasser Arafat, Angela Davis and Nelson Mandela, as well as a number of other cosmonauts, Soviet military leaders, and independence fighters.

=== List of recipients ===
1. Yuri Gagarin, Soviet cosmonaut (26 July 1961)
2. Angela Davis, American political activist (1972)
3. Samora Machel, President of Mozambique (October 1973)
4. Valentina Tereshkova, Soviet cosmonaut (29 March 1974)
5. Yasser Arafat, President of the Palestinian National Authority (November 1974)
6. Leonid Brezhnev, General Secretary of the Communist Party of the Soviet Union (1976)
7. Salim Rubai Ali, head of state of the People's Democratic Republic of Yemen (South Yemen) (1977)
8. Rafael Cancel Miranda, Puerto Rican independence fighter (1979)
9. Lolita Lebrón, Puerto Rican independence fighter (1979)
10. Irvin Flores, Puerto Rican independence fighter (1979)
11. Oscar Collazo, Puerto Rican independence fighter (1979)
12. Andrés Figueroa Cordero, Puerto Rican independence fighter (1979, posthumous)
13. Yuri Romanenko, Soviet cosmonaut (1980)
14. Arnaldo Tamayo Méndez, Cuban cosmonaut (1980)
15. Leonid Popov, Soviet cosmonaut (1980)
16. Vladimir Shatalov, Soviet cosmonaut (1980)
17. Nelson Mandela, South African political prisoner (1984)
18. Oliver Tambo, South African anti-apartheid activist (24 March 1986)
19. Sergey Sokolov, Soviet commander (1986)
20. Valery Ryumin, Soviet cosmonaut
21. The Cuban Five, Cuban intelligence officers Gerardo Hernández, Ramón Labañino, Antonio Guerrero, René González and Fernando González. Awarded in 2001 and presented on their release from prison in 2015.
22. Enrique Carreras Rolas, Cuban soldier (2001)
23. Lázaro Cárdenas, president of Mexico
24. Pedro Miret, Cuban soldier (2001)
25. Julio Casas Regueiro, Cuban soldier (April 2001)
26. Viktor Kulikov, Warsaw Pact commander-in-chief (2006)
27. Asela de los Santos, Cuban teacher, revolutionary leader and politician (2009)
28. Romárico Sotomayor García, Cuban soldier (2015)

== See also ==
- Orders, decorations, and medals of Cuba
