= 1954 United States Capitol shooting =

Attack by Puerto Rican nationalists

1954 United States Capitol attack
- Part of Puerto Rican Nationalist Party insurgency
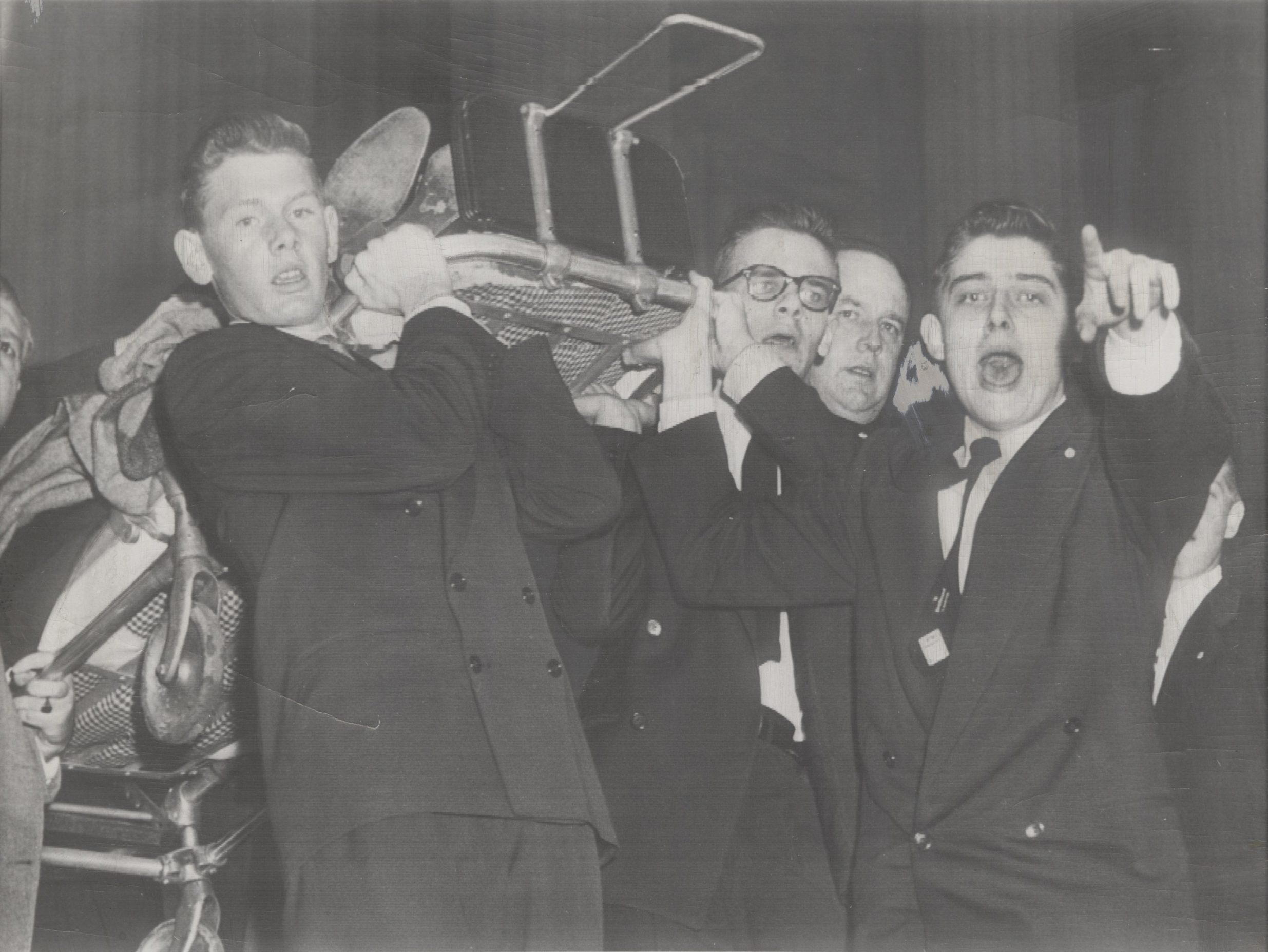
- House pages carry wounded Representative Alvin M. Bentley from the House chamber after the shooting.
- Location: Washington, D.C., United States
- Date: March 1, 1954
- Target: United States Capitol (chamber of the House of Representatives)
- Attack type: Mass shooting
- Weapons: Semi-automatic pistols: Walther P38 9mm, Luger P08 9mm, Artillery Luger 9mm.
- Deaths: 0
- Injuries: 5 (Alvin M. Bentley, Clifford Davis, Ben F. Jensen, George Hyde Fallon, and Kenneth A. Roberts)
- Perpetrators: Lolita Lebrón, Rafael Cancel Miranda, Andrés Figueroa Cordero, and Irvin Flores Rodríguez
- Motive: Puerto Rican independence movement

On March 1, 1954, four Puerto Rican nationalists, seeking to promote Puerto Rican independence from the United States, attacked the United States Capitol. They fired 30 rounds from semi-automatic pistols onto the legislative floor from the Ladies' Gallery (a balcony for visitors) of the House of Representatives chamber within the United States Capitol.

The nationalists, identified as Lolita Lebrón, Rafael Cancel Miranda, Andres Figueroa Cordero, and Irvin Flores Rodríguez, unfurled a Puerto Rican flag and began shooting at Representatives in the 83rd Congress, who were debating an immigration bill. Five Representatives were wounded, one seriously, but all recovered. The assailants were arrested, tried successively in two federal courts and convicted. All received long consecutive sentences, amounting to life imprisonment. In 1978 and 1979, their sentences were commuted by President Jimmy Carter. All four returned to Puerto Rico.

== Background ==
=== Independence movement in Puerto Rico ===
The Puerto Rican Nationalist Party was founded on September 17, 1922, by people seeking independence. They contended that, as a matter of international law, the 1898 Treaty of Paris, ending the Spanish–American War, could not empower the Spanish to "give" what was no longer theirs, in light of the 1897 Carta de Autonomía (Spanish Charter of Autonomy), whereby the Spanish Empire released Puerto Rico from colonial rule, giving the island sovereignty. While the Nationalists and other political parties supported independence, some political parties supported autonomy for the island within a formal relationship with the United States.

During this period of unrest, the electorate increasingly voted for the People's Democratic Party (PPD), which by 1940 controlled a majority in the legislature. It supported the Puerto Rico Federal Relations Act of 1950 by the US Congress, which established Puerto Rico as an Estado Libre Asociado ("Free Associated State"), with some autonomy. The people could elect their own governor, from the ruling PPD party; a bicameral legislature was established, and executive functions similar to those of American states were developed. The US retained responsibility for defense and foreign treaties.

=== Puerto Rican Nationalist Party response ===
The Puerto Rican Nationalist Party Revolts of the 1950s were a call for independence against the US government. The party demanded the recognition of the 1897 Carta de Autonomía, and Puerto Rico's international sovereignty. It also repudiated the status of Estado Libre Asociado, established in 1950 by law, as continued colonialism.

External videos
- You may watch newsreel scenes of the Ponce massacre here

The Nationalist president, Pedro Albizu Campos, ordered armed uprisings on October 30, 1950, in several towns, including Peñuelas, Mayagüez, Naranjito, Arecibo and Ponce. The most notable uprisings occurred in Utuado, Jayuya, and San Juan. They were suppressed by Puerto Rican forces, assisted by US forces.

In Utuado, police killed the insurgents after they attacked the station. In Jayuya, insurgents declared the "Free Republic of Puerto Rico" after taking control of the police station; they held the city for three days, until the U.S. sent bomber planes, artillery, Puerto Rican National Guard and Army troops to suppress the revolt. In San Juan, the Nationalists attacked the governor's residence, intending to assassinate the governor, Luis Muñoz Marín, but were unsuccessful.

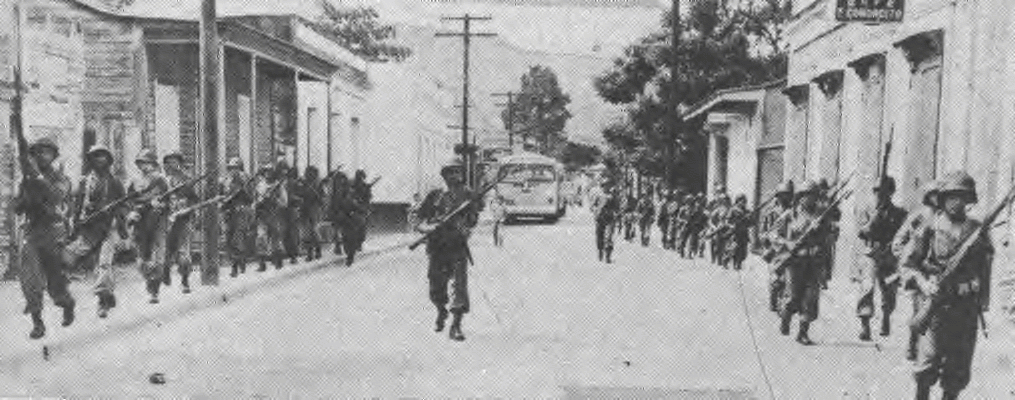
The National Guard, commanded by the Puerto Rico Adjutant General Major General Luis R. Esteves and under the orders of Gov. Luis Muñoz Marín, occupy Jayuya to fight the Nationalist uprising

The revolts resulted in many casualties: of the 28 dead, 16 were Nationalists, 7 were police officers, 1 a National Guardsman, and 4 were uninvolved civilians. Of the 49 wounded, 23 were police officers, 6 were National guardsmen, 9 were Nationalists, and 11 were uninvolved civilians.

The actions were not limited to Puerto Rico. Two Puerto Rican Nationalists, who were living in New York City at the time, planned to assassinate the US president, Harry S. Truman. On November 1, 1950, they attacked police and Secret Service to gain access to Blair House in Washington, D.C., where Truman was staying during major renovations of the White House. One Nationalist, Griselio Torresola, was killed in the attack, as was a White House police officer, Leslie Coffelt. The other, Oscar Collazo, was tried, convicted, and sentenced to prison.

Acknowledging the importance of the question of Puerto Rico's status, Truman supported a plebiscite in Puerto Rico in 1952 offering a choice between continued direct rule as a colony and limited autonomy. While nearly 82% of those voting approved the new constitution and Free Associated State, or Commonwealth, independence was not an option on the ballot and most Nationalists boycotted the election.

=== Attack preparations ===
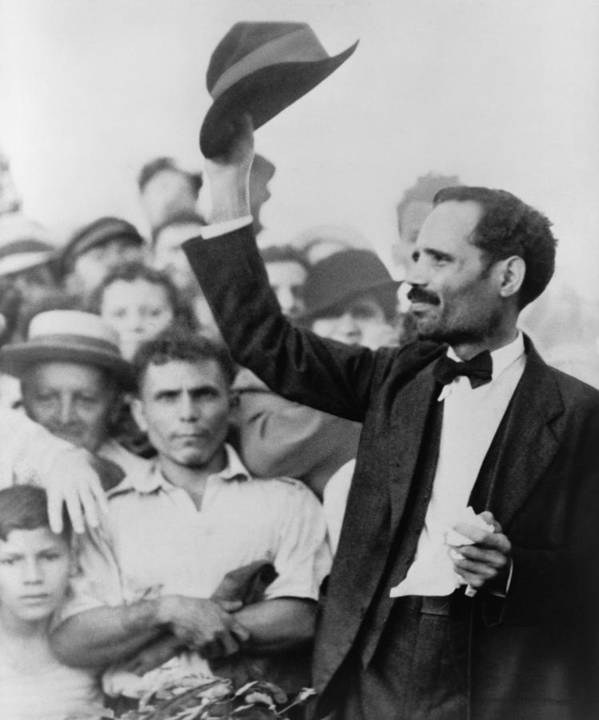
Don Pedro Albizu Campos

Nationalists were not satisfied with the people's vote in the plebiscite. In the early 1950s, Don Pedro Albizu Campos, president of the Puerto Rican Nationalist Party, had been corresponding from his prison with 34-year-old Lolita Lebrón. Some of this correspondence discussed the Nationalist Party revolts of 1950. It also discussed Puerto Rican Governor Luis Muñoz Marín, who had succeeded in having Puerto Rico declared an Estado Libre Asociado (Free Associated State) of the U.S.

In 1954, a group of Nationalists, which included Lebrón, Rafael Cancel Miranda, Irvin Flores and Andrés Figueroa Cordero, decided to focus the world's attention on Puerto Rico's status, which they considered as a colony of the U.S. They planned to attack multiple locations in Washington, D.C., with force.

Albizu Campos did not order this attack, but the Nationalists continued to plan for it. Lebrón decided to lead the group and, eventually, the attack. Lebrón concluded that a single attack on the House of Representatives had a greater prospect for success than trying to attack multiple targets. They chose the date of March 1, 1954, to coincide with the opening of the Conferencia Interamericana (Interamerican Conference) in Caracas. Lebrón intended to call attention to Puerto Rico's independence cause, particularly among the Latin American countries at the conference.

== Attack ==
External videos
- Newsreel scenes (in English and Spanish) of the Nationalist attack on the U.S. Capitol

On the morning of March 1, Lebrón traveled to Grand Central Terminal in Manhattan, where she rendezvoused with the rest of the group. They took the train to Washington, DC, and went the short distance from Union Station to the Capitol. Rafael Cancel Miranda suggested they postpone the attack, as it was late and the weather was rainy. Lebrón said, "I am alone" and continued towards the Capitol building's interior. The group looked at each other, and decided to follow her.

When Lebrón's group reached the visitor's gallery above the House chamber, they sat while the representatives discussed the Mexican economy and issues of immigration. After Lebrón gave the order, the group quickly recited the Lord's Prayer. She stood up and shouted, "¡Viva Puerto Rico libre!" (approximately, "Long live a free Puerto Rico!") and unfurled the flag of Puerto Rico. The group opened fire with semi-automatic pistols toward the Representatives below.

Some 30 shots were fired (mostly by Cancel, according to his account), wounding five lawmakers. Lebrón said she fired her shots at the ceiling, while Figueroa's pistol jammed. Wounded were Alvin Morell Bentley (R-Michigan), who took a bullet to the chest, Clifford Davis (D-Tennessee), hit in the leg, Ben F. Jensen (R-Iowa), shot in the back, as well as George Hyde Fallon (D-Maryland) and Kenneth A. Roberts (D-Alabama). House pages helped carry Bentley off the House floor. The representatives were treated and recovered. Upon being arrested, Lebrón yelled, "I did not come to kill anyone, I came to die for Puerto Rico!"

== Aftermath and arrests ==
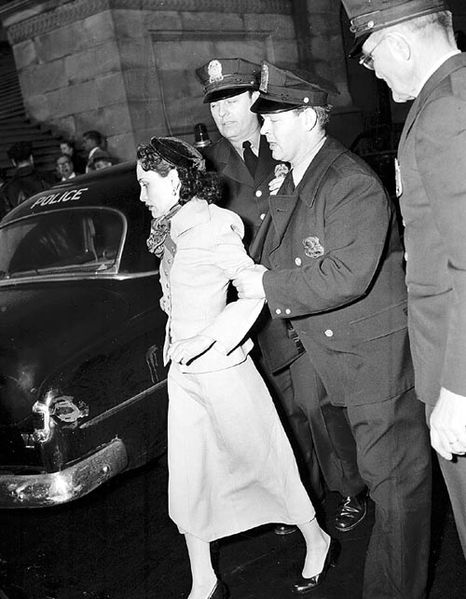
Lebrón led by police officers following her arrest

The Nationalists were immediately arrested in Washington, D.C. The next morning in Puerto Rico, the Insular Police raided the home of Pedro Albizu Campos, president of the Nationalist Party, with guns and tear gas. Under the command of the Chief of Police of Puerto Rico, Salvador T. Roig, they fired into Campos' home from the roof of a Pentecostal Church and from a boarding house which faced the home. They arrested Campos and took him to jail. He was unconscious and half-asphyxiated when taken from the house.

Police Chief Roig later said that the order to arrest Albizu Campos "did not make any sense." Albizu Campos's phones were tapped, his mail was being intercepted, and Albizu was under 24-hour surveillance by the FBI, the CIA and the Insular Police. The FBI reports on Albizu Campos and the Puerto Rican Nationalist Party ultimately exceeded over one million pages in length. They found no evidence that Albizu was directly connected with the attack on Congress.

The Governor of Puerto Rico, Luis Muñoz Marín, revoked Albizu's pardon, and had the political leader returned to La Princesa prison, from which he had been released only six months before. He was accused of sedition, violation of Puerto Rico Law 53 of 1948 (otherwise known as the "Gag Law") and the attempted violent overthrow of the U.S. government. Two years later, on March 25, 1956, Albizu Campos suffered an embolism and a stroke while in prison, leaving him semi-paralyzed and mute. He was not released from U.S. federal custody for another nine years, shortly before his death, which occurred on April 21, 1965.

== Trial and imprisonment ==
Lebrón, Cancel Miranda and the other defendants were charged in federal court in Washington with attempted murder and other crimes. The trial began on June 4, 1954, with federal Judge Alexander Holtzoff presiding over the case, under strict security measures. A jury composed of seven men and five women was assembled; their identities were kept secret. The prosecution was led by Leo A. Rover; 33 witnesses testified.

Ruth Mary Reynolds helped secure the services of noted activist attorney Conrad Lynn as a lawyer for Lebrón and the other three co-defendants. The accused were the only ones to testify in their defense. Lebrón reaffirmed that she came, not to kill, but "to die for the freedom of her homeland."

On June 16, 1954, the jury declared the four guilty, except that Lebrón was acquitted of assault with the intent to kill and instead convicted of the lesser offense of assault with a deadly weapon. Judge Holtzoff imposed maximum consecutive prison terms: 75 years' imprisonment for each of the men, and 50 years for Lebrón. Given the age of the accused, this effectively meant imprisonment for life, unless they were paroled earlier.

American League lawyers appealed the sentence. The United States Court of Appeals for the District of Columbia Circuit affirmed the convictions and sentences in early 1956.

On July 13, 1954, the four defendants were taken to New York, where they appeared before federal Judge Lawrence E. Walsh of the United States District Court for the Southern District of New York, to face related charges, with additional co-defendants, of seditious conspiracy. This charge encompassed, but was broader than, the attack on the Congress. They declared themselves not guilty on the charge of "trying to overthrow the government of the United States," but remained firm in demanding independence for Puerto Rico. Among the prosecution's witnesses was Gonzalo Lebrón Jr., who testified against his sister.

On October 26, 1954, the jury found all of the defendants guilty of conspiracy. Judge Walsh sentenced each of them to six additional years in prison. The Second Circuit Court of Appeals affirmed the conspiracy convictions and consecutive sentences in 1955.

The four were sent to different prisons: Figueroa Cordero to the federal penitentiary in Atlanta; Lebrón to the women's prison in Alderson, West Virginia; Cancel Miranda to Alcatraz, in San Francisco Bay; and Flores Rodriguez to Leavenworth, Kansas, where Oscar Collazo was incarcerated following his involvement in the attempted assassination of President Harry S Truman in 1950.

=== Release ===
Figueroa Cordero was released in 1978. One year later, in 1979, President Jimmy Carter commuted the sentences of the remaining perpetrators. Some analysts said this was in exchange for Fidel Castro's release of several American CIA agents being held in Cuba on espionage charges, but the US said that was not the case. The freed nationalists were received in Puerto Rico with a "heroes' welcome" by roughly 5,000 people at San Juan International Airport.

== See also ==
- José S. Alegría
- Casimiro Berenguer
- Puerto Rican Independence Party
- 1983 United States Senate bombing
- 1998 United States Capitol shooting
- Shooting of Miriam Carey (2013)
- 2017 Congressional baseball shooting
- January 6 United States Capitol attack
- April 2021 United States Capitol car attack
- List of incidents of political violence in Washington, D.C.
- List of attacks on legislatures
