= Lolita Lebrón =

Puerto Rican nationalist (1919–2010)

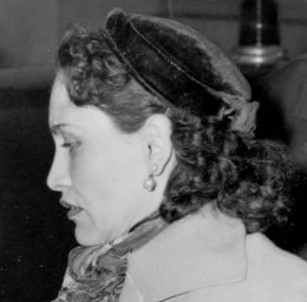
- Lebrón in 1954
- Born: Dolores Lebrón Sotomayor; November 19, 1919; Lares, Puerto Rico
- Died: August 1, 2010 (aged 90); San Juan, Puerto Rico
- Political party: Puerto Rican Nationalist Party
- Movement: Puerto Rican Independence
- Spouse: Sergio Irizarry

Lolita Lebrón (Spanish pronunciation: [loˈlita leˈβɾon]; November 19, 1919 – August 1, 2010) was a Puerto Rican nationalist who was convicted of aggravated assault and other crimes after carrying out an armed attack on the United States Capitol in 1954, which resulted in the wounding of five members of the United States Congress. She was released from prison in 1979 after being granted clemency by President Jimmy Carter. Lebrón was born and raised in Lares, Puerto Rico, where she joined the Puerto Rican Liberal Party. In her youth she met Francisco Matos Paoli, a Puerto Rican poet, with whom she had a relationship. In 1941, Lebrón migrated to New York City, where she joined the Puerto Rican Nationalist Party, gaining influence within the party's leadership.

In the early 1950s, the Nationalist Party began a series of revolutionary actions, including the 1950 Jayuya Uprising against American presence on the island. They conducted these attacks to protest the false and misleading claims by the United States government and Luis Muñoz Marín that Puerto Rico would no longer be dominated by the United States. As part of this initiative, Pedro Albizu Campos ordered Lebrón to organize attacks in the United States, focusing on locations that were "the most strategic to the enemy." Lebrón led a group of nationalists that attacked the United States House of Representatives in 1954.

She was convicted, found guilty and incarcerated as a result. Lebrón remained imprisoned for 25 years, until 1979 when Jimmy Carter issued commutations to the group involved in the attack. After their release in 1979, the group returned to Puerto Rico, where supporters of Puerto Rican independence received them warmly. During the following years, Lebrón continued her involvement in pro-independence activities, including the protesting the existence of a United States Navy base at Vieques. Her life would be subsequently detailed in books and a documentary. On August 1, 2010, Lebrón died from complications of a cardiorespiratory infection.

== Early life ==
Lebrón (birth name: Dolores Lebrón Sotomayor) was one of five siblings born in Lares, Puerto Rico to Gonzalo Lebrón Bernal and Rafaela Soto Luciano; the other four children were Aurea, Augusto, Gonzalo Jr. and Julio. Lebrón was raised in Hacienda Pezuelas in Pezuela, a barrio in Lares. Gonzalo Lebrón worked as the hacienda's foreman earning a salary of $30 a month. The owner allowed Lebrón to live in a "small house" and also permitted the family to plant produce.

In Pezuela, Lebrón began her education in a small community school. Early in her life, Lebrón contracted pneumonia when she accidentally fell into a gutter that was full of water. As a consequence of this illness, she grew with a frail body and was unable to keep up with the constant activities of her brothers without feeling fatigue. She developed an introverted and contemplative personality, often spending time admiring nature around the hacienda.

From Pezuela the family moved to Mirasol, also in Lares, where Gonzalo Lebrón administered a hacienda owned by Emilio Vilellas. There Lolita received a better education and attended a local public school. When Lebrón completed the sixth grade she attended the Segunda Unidad Rural, a middle school located in Bartolo, an adjacent barrio. She concluded her formal public school education in the eighth grade.

Lebrón had uncommonly good looks and when she was a teenager won first place in the annual "Queen of the Flowers of May" beauty contest held in Lares. Although her father was an atheist, Lebrón was baptized in the Catholic faith when she was fourteen years as were her other siblings. During the baptism celebration she met Francisco Matos Paoli, who became her first boyfriend. Paoli and Lebrón wrote letters to each other in which they exchanged the poetry which they wrote. According to Jossianna Arroyo, Lolita wrote "more mystical poetry, centered on what she called 'visions' filled with religious symbolism." Paoli's family opposed their relationship because they considered Lebrón a jíbara (peasant). Her father also opposed this relationship and ordered her to stop writing Paoli. However, they both continued to write each other until Paoli moved out of the city.

Lebrón eventually moved to San Juan, where she studied sewing and continued her correspondence with Paoli. She felt duty bound to return to Lares because her father was severely affected by tuberculosis. The family was forced to abandon the house in the hacienda, but Ramón Santiago later provided them with a new house.

Lebrón took upon herself the responsibility of taking care of her father. She would travel to a nearby town to buy medicines for her father, which she gave him every seventy minutes. For seven days she didn't sleep or eat while taking care of him. Following his death, Lebrón began supporting herself by weaving clothes.

== Political activism ==
Although Lebrón was a member of the Liberal Party from a young age, she didn't display any interest in politics. However, her posture changed after March 21, 1937, when a group of militants from the Puerto Rican Nationalist Party were killed during a peaceful protest which became known as the Ponce massacre. Lebrón who was eighteen years old at the time, developed a nationalistic ideology following this event. During this timeframe, Lebrón had a relationship with a local engineer, following the advice of her family. When she was twenty-one years old she gave birth to her first daughter Gladys, who was left in Rafaela Luciano's custody after Lebrón was separated from her husband and moved to New York City. After she arrived in New York City, she started to experience problems finding employment, mostly because she did not fully understand English. Lebrón worked as a seamstress in several factories. She was fired from some of her jobs because she was considered a "rebel by her bosses" after she protested against the discrimination which she witnessed against Puerto Rican workers. This influenced her nationalistic views even further and she eventually established contact with members of the Puerto Rican Liberation Movement. She enrolled at George Washington College, where she studied for two years during her free time from work. She married again when she was twenty-two years old and gave birth to her second child, whom she would send to Puerto Rico to live with her mother, a year later. Lebrón decided to divorce her husband because she felt that he was oppressing her. In 1943, there was a massive migration of Puerto Ricans from Puerto Rico to New York, composed mostly of jíbaros seeking employment. Lebrón grew increasingly frustrated when she observed how they were forced to live in poverty, under social decadence, and prejudice, and she increased her work within nationalist circles. In 1946, she formally became a member of the Puerto Rican Nationalist Party, following the advice of a friend. During this time she developed an admiration for the Party's president Pedro Albizu Campos, studying and memorizing his biography and ideals. After joining the party, Lebrón inadvertently included some of her own initiatives within the organization's ideals, these were influenced by socialist and feminist ideals. Seeking more involvement in society and politics for women, new economic systems and social reforms that would protect women and children. Her constant involvement in the party's affairs earned her several high-ranking positions, among them those of secretary, vice-president, and executive delegate of its delegation in New York.

On May 21, 1948, a bill was introduced before the Puerto Rican Senate which would restrain the rights of the independence and nationalist movements in the archipelago. The Senate, controlled by the Partido Popular Democrático (PPD) and presided by Luis Muñoz Marín, approved the bill that day. This bill, which resembled the anti-communist Smith Act passed in the United States in 1940, became known as the Ley de la Mordaza (Gag Law) when the U.S.-appointed governor of Puerto Rico, Jesús T. Piñero, signed it into law on June 10, 1948.

Under this new law it would be a crime to print, publish, sell, or exhibit any material intended to paralyze or destroy the insular government; or to organize any society, group or assembly of people with a similar destructive intent. It made it illegal to sing a patriotic song, and reinforced the 1898 law that had made it illegal to display the Flag of Puerto Rico, with anyone found guilty of disobeying the law in any way being subject to a sentence of up to ten years imprisonment, a fine of up to US$10,000 (equivalent to $134,000 in 2025), or both. According to Dr. Leopoldo Figueroa, the only non-PPD member of the Puerto Rico House of Representatives, the law was repressive and was in violation of the First Amendment of the US Constitution which guarantees Freedom of Speech. He pointed out that the law as such was a violation of the civil rights of the people of Puerto Rico.

On November 1, 1950, following a series of uprisings in Puerto Rico which included the Jayuya Uprising and the Utuado Uprising which culminated in a massacre, Oscar Collazo and Griselio Torresola invaded Harry S. Truman's residence, carrying a letter written by Albizu Campos and addressed to Truman. A shootout erupted between the duo and the guard stationed there, killing Torresola. Collazo was badly injured but survived and was sentenced to death by an American jury. The Puerto Rican Nationalist Party claimed that their goal was to "draw attention to the fact of Puerto Rico's continued colonial status", while the American government and media treated it as an assassination attempt. Following the sentence, Lebrón quickly joined the "Committee for Oscar Collazo's defense", participating in numerous public manifestations which eventually led to a presidential commutation. On July 25, 1952, the official name of Puerto Rico was changed to Estado Libre Associado (commonwealth of the United States) as a constitution was promulgated by Luis Muñoz Marín, the islands' first elected governor. In 1954, Lebrón received a letter from Albizu Campos, in which he declared his intention to order attacks on "three locations, the most strategic to the enemy".

== Assault on the House of Representatives ==
=== Attack preparations ===
Albizu Campos had been corresponding with 34-year-old Lebrón from prison and chose a group of nationalists who included Rafael Cancel Miranda, Irvin Flores and Andres Figueroa Cordero to attack locations in Washington, D.C. Upon receiving the order she communicated it to the leadership of the Nationalist party in New York and, although two members unexpectedly disagreed, the plan continued. Lebrón decided to lead the group, even though Albizu Campos did not order her to directly take part in the assault. She studied the plan, determining the possible weaknesses, concluding that a single attack on the House of Representatives would be more effective. The date for the attack on the House of Representatives was to be March 1, 1954. This date was chosen because it coincided with the inauguration of the Conferencia Interamericana (Interamerican Conference) in Caracas. Lebrón intended to call attention to Puerto Rico's independence cause, particularly among the Latin American countries participating in the conference.

=== The attack ===
On the morning of March 1, Lebrón travelled to Union Station, where she rendezvoused with the rest of the group. Once they arrived at the United States Capitol, Rafael Cancel Miranda suggested that the attack should be postponed because it was late and rainy. Lebrón responded, "I am alone" and continued towards the building's interior. The group followed, considering the attack a coup d'état, the most important revolutionary act in the history of the Puerto Rican independence movement, the fourth uprising after the Grito de Lares, the Intentona de Yauco and the Jayuya Uprising. The other members of the group seemed serene and optimistic while rushing towards the legislative chamber.

When Lebrón's group reached the visitor's gallery above the chamber in the House, they sat while the representatives discussed Mexico's economy. Shortly thereafter, Lebrón gave the order to the other members, the group quickly recited the Lord's Prayer; then Lebrón stood up and shouted "¡Viva Puerto Rico Libre!" ("Long live a Free Puerto Rico!") and unfurled the flag of Puerto Rico. The group opened fire with semi-automatic pistols. Lebrón claimed that she fired her shots at the ceiling, while Figueroa's pistol jammed. Some 30 shots were fired (mostly by Cancel, according to his account), wounding five lawmakers; one representative, Alvin Morell Bentley from Michigan, was seriously wounded in the chest. Upon being arrested, Lebrón yelled, "I did not come to kill anyone, I came to die for Puerto Rico!".

=== Trial and imprisonment ===
Lebrón and her group were charged with attempted murder and other crimes. She was imprisoned in the Federal Correctional Institution for Women in Alderson, West Virginia. The trial began on June 4, 1954, with judge Alexander Holtzoff presiding over the case, under strict security measures. A jury composed of seven men and five women was assembled, their identities kept secret from the media.

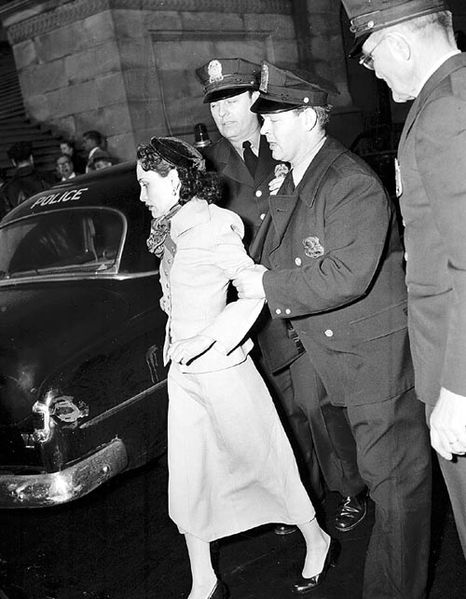
Lebrón being led by police officers following her arrest

The prosecution was led by Leo A. Rover, as part of this process 33 witnesses testified. Ruth Mary Reynolds, the "American/Puerto Rican Nationalist" and the organization which she founded "American League for Puerto Rico's Independence" came to the defense of Lebrón and the three other Nationalists. Lebrón and the other members of the group were the only defense witnesses, as part of her testimony she reaffirmed that they "came to die for the liberty of her homeland". As part of her 20-minute speech to the jury at her trial, Lebrón stated that she was "being crucified for the freedom of my country."

During the early part of their trial she remained calm, complaining through her lawyers alleged disrespect for the flag while it was being produced as evidence. She loudly protested when the defense suggested that the group might have suffered from mental instability while committing the deed. On June 16, 1954, the jury found all four defendants guilty. On the morning of July 8, 1954, Lebrón learned of her son's death minutes before the sentence was to be announced. She was quiet at the beginning of the hearing, but at one point, unable to contain herself, she became hysterical. Holtzoff chose to sentence them to the longest terms of imprisonment possible. In Lebrón's case this was between sixteen and fifty years, depending on her behavior.

Back at the prison, she went into shock upon receiving official notice of her son's death and did not speak for three days. On July 13, 1954, the four nationalists were taken to New York, where they pleaded not guilty to the charges of "trying to overthrow the government of the United States". One of the witnesses for the prosecution was Gonzalo Lebrón Jr., who testified against his sister. On October 26, 1954, judge Lawrence E. Walsh found all the defendants guilty of conspiracy and sentenced them to six additional years in prison.

Lebrón was sentenced to a fifty-year prison term. Lebrón stated the first two years in prison were the most difficult, having to deal with the deaths of her son and mother. Communication with her siblings was non-existent. Lebrón refused to accept letters from her sister because only letters written in English were permitted in the prison. Communication with the outside world was not allowed then. Later it was granted after several inmates went on a hunger strike that lasted three and a half days. Due to her participation, Lebrón was not allowed to perform work outside of her cell for some time, although she was eventually allowed to work at the infirmary. While in prison, a group of judges offered her parole in exchange for a public apology, which she indignantly rejected.

After completing the first 15 years of the sentence, Lebrón's social worker told her that she could ask for parole, but she did not display interest in the proposal, never signing the required documentation. Due to this lack of interest, she was mandated to attend a meeting before a penitentiary committee, where she presented a written deposition expressing her position about the parole proposal, as well as other subjects including terrorism, politics, and the United States' use of the atomic bomb. Following this, the other inmates reacted with skepticism over her intentions to refuse the offer, which made her distance herself from them, and focus her attention in studying, as well as writing poetry. During this timeframe, Lebrón's interest in religion grew. Lebrón's daughter Gladys died in 1977, while her mother was in prison.

== Later years, death and legacy ==
External audio
- An elder Lolita Lebron before the "Young Project" hearings of 1997 on YouTube

In 1979 President Jimmy Carter commuted the sentences of Lolita Lebrón, Irvin Flores, and Rafael Cancel Miranda after they had served 25 years in prison. Andrés Figueroa Cordero was released from prison earlier because of a terminal illness. Governor of Puerto Rico Carlos Romero Barceló publicly opposed the commutations granted by Carter, stating that it would encourage terrorism and undermine public safety. Lebrón received a heroine's welcome by her supporters upon her return to her motherland. Lebrón married Sergio Irizarry Rivera and continued to participate in pro-independence activities. The couple had met while she was in prison, when the Nationalist Party ordered him to monitor her health. Their marriage took place eight years after they had met. They moved into a small house in Loiza. The house possessed few distinctive traits, mostly composed of religious iconography and a large flag of Puerto Rico in the living room.

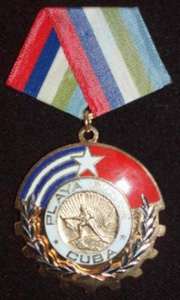
Cuban "Order of Playa Girón"

In 1979, Lolita Lebrón, Irvin Flores, Rafael Cancel Miranda and Oscar Collazo were recognized as the embodiment of the directive of their teacher Albizu Campos to exercise valor and sacrifice before representatives of fifty-one countries at the International Conference in Support of Independence for Puerto Rico, held in Mexico City.

That same year Lebrón and her group were awarded the Order of Playa Girón in Cuba. The Order of Playa Girón is a national order conferred by the Council of State of Cuba on Cubans or foreigners.

On May 22, 2000, she erroneously filed charges of verbal assault against Nívea Hernández, the mother of then-Puerto Rico Senator Kenneth McClintock who subsequently served as Minority Leader, and later President, of the Senate of Puerto Rico and served as Secretary of State, after a discussion ensued between her and an unidentified woman at a pharmacy in San Juan. The case was reported after an employee of the establishment identified the instigator as Hernández, who was recuperating from surgery at the moment and died two months later.

She continued to be active in the independence cause and participated in the protests against the United States Navy's presence in Vieques. Lebrón appeared as a witness at the "International Tribunal on Violations of Human Rights in Puerto Rico and Vieques" held on November 17–21, 2000, on the island of Vieques. According to the local newspaper El Vocero, her audience applauded when Lebrón said at the end of her deposition "I had the honor of leading the act against the U.S. Congress on March 1, 1954, when we demanded freedom for Puerto Rico and we told the world that we are an invaded nation, occupied and abused by the United States of America. I feel very proud of having performed that day, of having answered the call of the motherland". On June 26, 2001, Lebrón was among a group of protesters that were arrested for trespassing in the restricted area in Vieques. On July 19, 2001, she was sentenced to 60 days of prison on the charge that she was trespassing on Navy property. Lebrón had already served 23 days in jail since her June arrest, leaving her to serve 37 additional days. Less than two years after Lebron's Vieques protest, on May 1, 2003, the U.S. Navy left Vieques and turned over its facilities to the government of Puerto Rico. Following this, she continued her participation in other pro independence activities.

On September 5, 2005, the couple was transported to a hospital, after a fire affected part of their house, causing $14,000 in material losses.

Lebrón was among the political leaders that opposed the Democratic Party's primary that took place on June 1, 2008. The group anticipated a low voter turnout in the event, while declaring that Puerto Rico "deserves sovereignty". On June 10, 2008, Lebrón suffered a fracture in her hip and a wrist after accidentally falling in her house. She underwent corrective surgery at a San Juan hospital. A film inspired by Lebrón's life was being considered in 2009, with actress Eva Longoria. but was never produced.

Between 2008 and 2010, Lebrón was hospitalized multiple times, the first being due to a fall that fractured her hip and an arm, requiring surgery. On September 18, 2009, she suffered a notable relapse due to a cardio respiratory infection. Lebrón recovered in a satisfactory manner and issued a press release in appreciation for the public's support. Complications from this episode of bronchitis, however, persisted throughout 2010, leading to her death on August 1, 2010. Multiple public figures, who support independence or free association for Puerto Rico, immediately lamented Lebrón's death, praising her activism. Her life was eulogized in some European papers.

=== Legacy ===
Among the homages received by Lebrón are paintings, books and a documentary. Mexican artist Octavio Ocampo created a poster of Lebrón, which was exhibited at the Galería de la Raza in San Francisco, California. In Chicago's Humboldt Park, there is a mural depicting Lebrón among other well known Puerto Ricans. In addition to these works, Lebrón became a popular subject in silkscreen art. One such work that has garnered a lot of attention is Linda Lucero’s work Lolita Lebrón: ¡Viva Puerto Rico Libre! The artist was interested in learning about political prisoners being held in the United States, and Lebrón stood out to her as a potential subject for a poster regarding the formation of a community. Furthermore, as a resident of San Francisco’s Mission District, a region whose Latino population featured only a small percent of Puerto Ricans, Lucero’s decision to depict Lebrón was unexpected, and perhaps reflected the “internal colony” thesis. One of the most often discussed elements of the work is that Lebrón, typically regarded as a white woman by Puerto Ricans, is rendered in burnt sienna to highlight her brown skin. The poster is perceived as portraying Lebrón as a contemplative, suffering figure, who some scholars regard as embodying a "racialized colonial subject who suffers at the hands of an imperial power". This artistic portrayal of Lebrón contrasts the common interpretation of the US press’ portrayal of her as a femme fatale. This work became widely recognized, and is today housed in the Smithsonian American Art Museum.

Another silkscreen representation of Lebrón, also in the Smithsonian American Art Museum, is Lolita Lebrón, Puerto Rican Freedom Fighterby Marcos Dimas. In contrast to Lucero's suffering Lebrón, or the media's description of her as a terrorist, with headlines such as “When terror wore lipstick,” Dimas represents a portrayal of Lolita Lebrón that scholars regard as “heroic,” showing her in three-quarter profile with her eyes defiantly raised and staring ahead in determination, repeated four times in the same color palette on the poster, and declaring her as a “Puerto Rican Freedom Fighter”. Beyond art, writer, director and film producer Judith Escalona is planning to make a film about Lebrón's life. Federico Ribes Tovar published a book titled Lolita la Prisionera.

There is a plaque, located at the monument to the Jayuya Uprising participants in Mayagüez, Puerto Rico, honoring the women of the Puerto Rican Nationalist Party. Lebron's name is on the first line of the third plate.

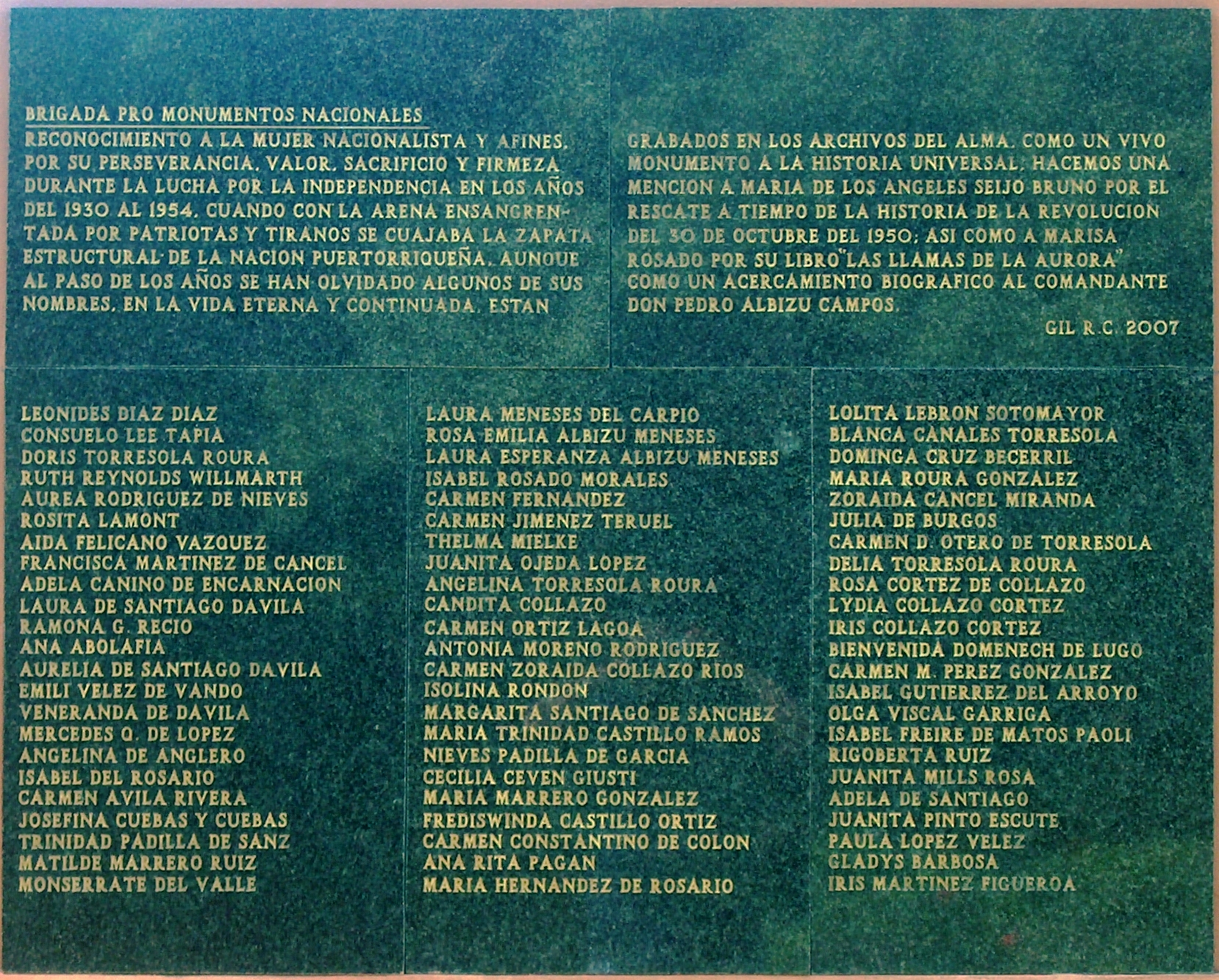
Plaque honoring the women of the Puerto Rican Nationalist Party

Among the books that include the story of Lebrón are The Ladies' Gallery: A Memoir of Family Secrets by Irene Vilar (Lebrón's granddaughter), translated by Gregory Rabassa (formerly published as A Message from God in the Atomic Age). The author criticizes her grandmother as a distant, gun-toting, larger-than-life figure who cast a veil of pain and secrecy over her family so vast that Ms. Vilar is still untangling herself from it. It also documents the death of Lebrón's only daughter (Vilar's mother) as suicide. Irene Vilar began to write the novel in a psychiatric hospital in Syracuse, New York.

Lebrón's granddaughter, Vilar, may have had a slight change of heart after Hurricane Maria devastated Puerto Rico. She recalled her grandmother's wisdom in that she often said that if Puerto Ricans could feed themselves they could have their country. Vilar appealed for donations of seeds (farmers had lost everything), and received "so many we didn't know what to do with them" so she started the "Resilience Fund" with Tara Rodriguez Besosa. She felt they had to work quickly to save farms and farmer's livelihoods.

== See also ==
- List of Puerto Ricans
- History of women in Puerto Rico
- List of people pardoned or granted clemency by the president of the United States

19th Century female leaders of the Puerto Rican Independence Movement

- María de las Mercedes Barbudo
- Lola Rodríguez de Tió
- Mariana Bracetti

Female members of the Puerto Rican Nationalist Party

- Blanca Canales
- Rosa Collazo
- Julia de Burgos
- Ruth Mary Reynolds
- Isabel Rosado
- Isabel Freire de Matos
- Isolina Rondón
- Olga Viscal Garriga

Articles related to the Puerto Rican Independence Movement

- Puerto Rican Nationalist Party Revolts of the 1950s
- Puerto Rican Nationalist Party
- Ponce massacre
- Río Piedras massacre
- Puerto Rican Independence Party
- Grito de Lares
- Intentona de Yauco
- Boricua Popular Army
- Fuerzas Armadas de Liberación Nacional (Puerto Rico)
