= Linda Lucero =

American artist

Linda Zamora Lucero is an American artist, based in San Francisco. Lucero was a co-founder and former executive director of La Raza Graphics Center, also known as La Raza Silkscreen Center and La Raza Graphics, noted for producing silkscreen prints and posters by Chicano and Latino artists.

== Early life and education ==
Lucero was born and raised in San Francisco. After graduating from Mission High School, Lucero attended City College of San Francisco and San Francisco State University.

== Career ==
Lucero was the executive director of La Raza Graphics Center, founded in 1971, which later merged with the Mission Cultural Center for Latino Arts.

In 1986, Lucero organized a commission of a silkscreen print portfolio called Buscando America to celebrate the 15th anniversary of the La Raza Graphics Center. The portfolio included works from Enrique Chagoya, Domitila Domínguez, and Irene Pérez, among others.

In 1996, the California Ethnic and Multicultural Archives established the Linda Lucero Collection on La Raza Silkscreen Center / La Raza Graphics.

Lucero later became the executive and artistic director for Yerba Buena Arts and Events and the Yerba Buena Gardens Festival.

Lucero's 1975 depiction of Puerto Rican nationalist Lolita Lebrón, entitled Lolita Lebrón ¡Viva Puerto Rico Libre!, was featured in the Smithsonian American Art Museum's exhibition, ¡Printing the Revolution! The Rise and Impact of Chicano Graphics, 1965 to Now. In 2019, the museum acquired a second work by Lucero entitled América.

== Works ==
=== Prints ===
- Lolita Lebrón ¡Viva Puerto Rico Libre! (1975)
- Lolita Lebrón ¡Que Viva Puerto Rico Libre! (1977)
- La Biblioteca de La Mission: Conozca Su Biblioteca Publica [The Mission Branch Library : Know your public library] (1985)
- América (n.d.)

=== Short stories ===
- Take the Money and Run—1968 (2015)
- Balmy Alley Forever (2016)
- Vistas and Byways (2018)
- When it Rains (2020)
- Mexican Hat (2020)
