= Fred L. Crawford =

American politician (1888–1957)

Fred Lewis Crawford
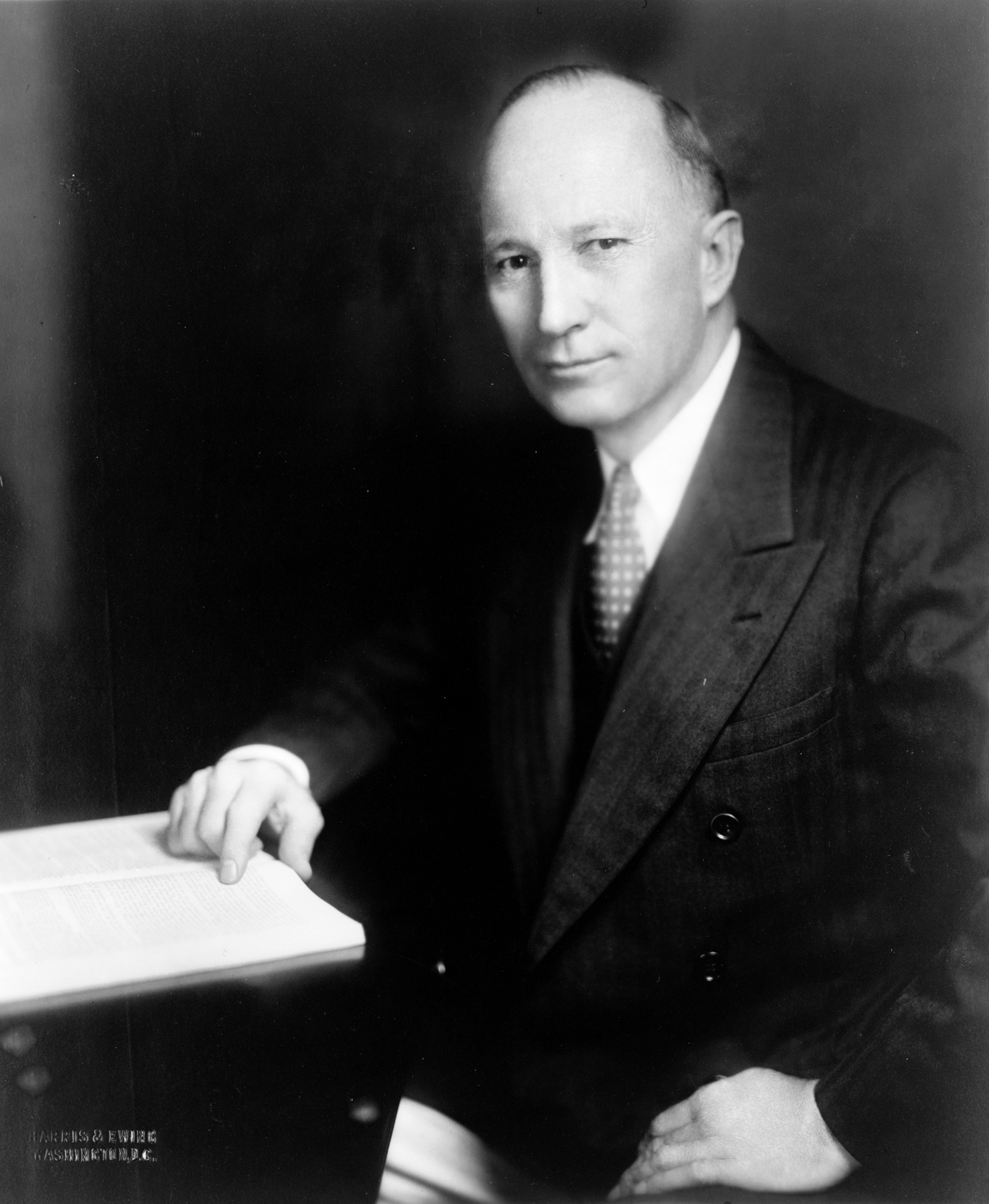

Member of the U.S. House of Representatives from Michigan's 8th district
- In office January 3, 1935 – January 3, 1953
- Preceded by: Michael J. Hart
- Succeeded by: Alvin M. Bentley

Personal details
- Born: May 5, 1888 Dublin, Texas
- Died: April 13, 1957 (aged 68) Washington, D.C.
- Party: Republican
- Education: University of Michigan
- Occupation: Accountant

Fred Lewis Crawford (May 5, 1888 – April 13, 1957) was a politician from the U.S. state of Michigan.

Crawford was born in Dublin, Texas, and attended local public schools. He went to business college at Peniel (now part of Greenville, Texas), and attended the University of Michigan at Ann Arbor. He engaged in accountancy at Des Moines, Iowa, and Detroit, Michigan, 1914-1917. He built, financed, and operated beet sugar mills in various sections of the United States, 1917-1935. He also engaged in manufacturing, ranching, and overland transportation. He was director of the Michigan National Bank and the Refiners Transport & Petroleum Corporation of Detroit at time of his death.

In 1934, Crawford was elected as a Republican from Michigan's 8th congressional district to the United States House of Representatives, defeating incumbent Democrat Michael J. Hart. Crawford served in the 74th Congress and the eight succeeding Congresses, from January 3, 1935, to January 3, 1953. In 1952, he was defeated in the Republican primary election by Alvin M. Bentley, who went on to win the general election.

As a member of the Committee on Insular Affairs, Crawford attended the inaugural ceremonies of the Commonwealth of the Philippines in 1935 and the Republic of the Philippines in 1946. His notebooks and other materials related to those events are archived at the Bentley Historical Library of the University of Michigan . Crawford was the ranking minority member on the Committee on Public Lands in the 81st and 82nd Congresses (1950–1952).

Crawford retired to his farm at Allentown in Prince George's County, Maryland. He died in Washington, D.C., and is interred in Cedar Hill Cemetery, Suitland, Maryland.

U.S. House of Representatives
Preceded by Michael J. Hart	United States Representative for the 8th congressional district of Michigan; 1935 – 1953	Succeeded by Alvin M. Bentley
