= Michael J. Hart =

American politician (1877–1951)

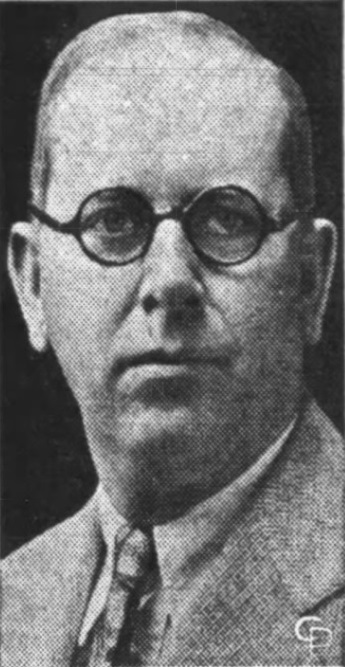
- The Herald-Press (Port Huron, MI), November 4, 1931

Member of the U.S. House of Representatives from Michigan's 8th district
- In office November 3, 1931 – January 3, 1935
- Preceded by: Bird J. Vincent
- Succeeded by: Fred L. Crawford

Personal details
- Born: July 16, 1877 Waterloo, Quebec, Canada
- Died: February 14, 1951 (aged 73) Saginaw, MI
- Party: Democratic
- Occupation: Teacher

Michael James Hart (July 16, 1877 – February 14, 1951) was a politician from the U.S. state of Michigan.

Hart was born in Waterloo, Quebec, Canada. He immigrated to the United States with his parents in 1880 and settled in James Township, Michigan, where he attended the district schools of Jamestown and Saginaw, and a business college. He worked as a teacher in the public schools of Saginaw County, from 1896 to 1898 and engaged in agricultural pursuits. In 1920, he also engaged in the packing and shipping of farm products.

In 1930, Hart was an unsuccessful candidate for election from Michigan's 8th congressional district to the 72nd Congress, losing to incumbent Republican Bird J. Vincent. After Vincent's death on July 18, 1931, Hart was elected in November 1931 to fill the vacancy, defeating Republican Foss O. Eldred largely because Eldred wanted to continue prohibition. Hart was elected to a full term in November 1932, and served from November 3, 1931 until January 3, 1935. In November 1934, 1936, and again in 1942, Hart was defeated in the general elections by Republican Fred L. Crawford. In 1940, he was an unsuccessful candidate in the Democratic Party primary election for a United States Senate seat. Hart was a delegate to the Democratic National Conventions from Michigan in 1932 and 1944.

After leaving Congress, Hart returned to Saginaw and his former business activities. He was also president of a brewing company from 1935 to 1937. Hart died in Saginaw and was interred in St. Andrews Cemetery there.

== Sources ==
- United States Congress. "Michael J. Hart (id: H000290)". Biographical Directory of the United States Congress.
- Michael J. Hart at The Political Graveyard

U.S. House of Representatives
| Preceded by Bird J. Vincent | United States Representative for the 8th congressional district of Michigan; 1931 – 1935 | Succeeded by Fred L. Crawford |
