= Kenneth A. Roberts =

American politician (1912–1989)

Kenneth Roberts
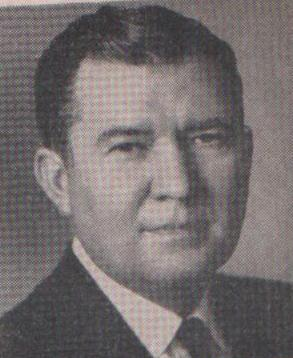

Member of the U.S. House of Representatives from Alabama
- In office January 3, 1951 – January 3, 1965
- Preceded by: Sam Hobbs
- Succeeded by: Glenn Andrews (redistricting)
- Constituency: 4th district (1951-1963); At-large (1963-1965)

Personal details
- Born: Kenneth Allison Roberts; November 1, 1912 Piedmont, Alabama, U.S.
- Died: May 9, 1989 (aged 76) Potomac, Maryland, U.S.
- Resting place: Arlington National Cemetery
- Party: Democratic
- Education: Samford University (BA); University of Alabama (LLB)

Kenneth Allison Roberts (November 1, 1912 – May 9, 1989) was an American lawyer, World War II veteran and politician who served seven terms as a U.S. representative from Alabama from 1951 to 1965.

== Biography ==
Born in Piedmont, Alabama, Roberts attended the public schools and Howard College, Birmingham, Alabama. He was graduated from the University of Alabama Law School in 1935 and admitted to the bar in 1936. He practiced law in Anniston, Alabama (1936) and in Talladega (1937–1942).

=== World War II ===
Roberts was elected to the Alabama State Senate in 1942 and resigned the same year to enter the United States Navy. He served in both Atlantic and Pacific Theaters until discharged as a lieutenant in 1945.

=== Early career ===
He was president of Piedmont Development Co. from 1945 to 1950. From 1948 to 1950 he served as member of Alabama State Board of Veterans Affairs and city attorney of Piedmont, Alabama.

=== Congress ===
Roberts was elected as a Democrat to the Eighty-second and to the six succeeding Congresses (January 3, 1951 – January 3, 1965). He was wounded in the 1954 United States Capitol shooting. Having been a signatory to the 1956 Southern Manifesto that opposed the desegregation of public schools ordered by the Supreme Court in Brown v. Board of Education, he voted against H.R. 6127, Civil Rights Act of 1957. He was an unsuccessful candidate for reelection in 1964 to the Eighty-ninth Congress.

Roberts led the establishment of federal safety legislation through the House of Representatives subcommittee on traffic safety which was formed in 1956.

In 1963 he introduced the U.S. Clean Air Act. During his last year in Congress, Roberts advocated a vision care program for the needy; linking the need for one to the War on Poverty.

During his time in Congress, Roberts had a voting record that was a predominantly liberal one, and has been described as a “consistently prolabor” congressman.

=== Later career ===
He resumed the practice of law until his retirement in 1979. From 1965 to 1972 he was Counsel for the Vehicle Equipment Safety Commission. He served as member of the National Highway Safety Advisory Committee from 1966 to 1970.

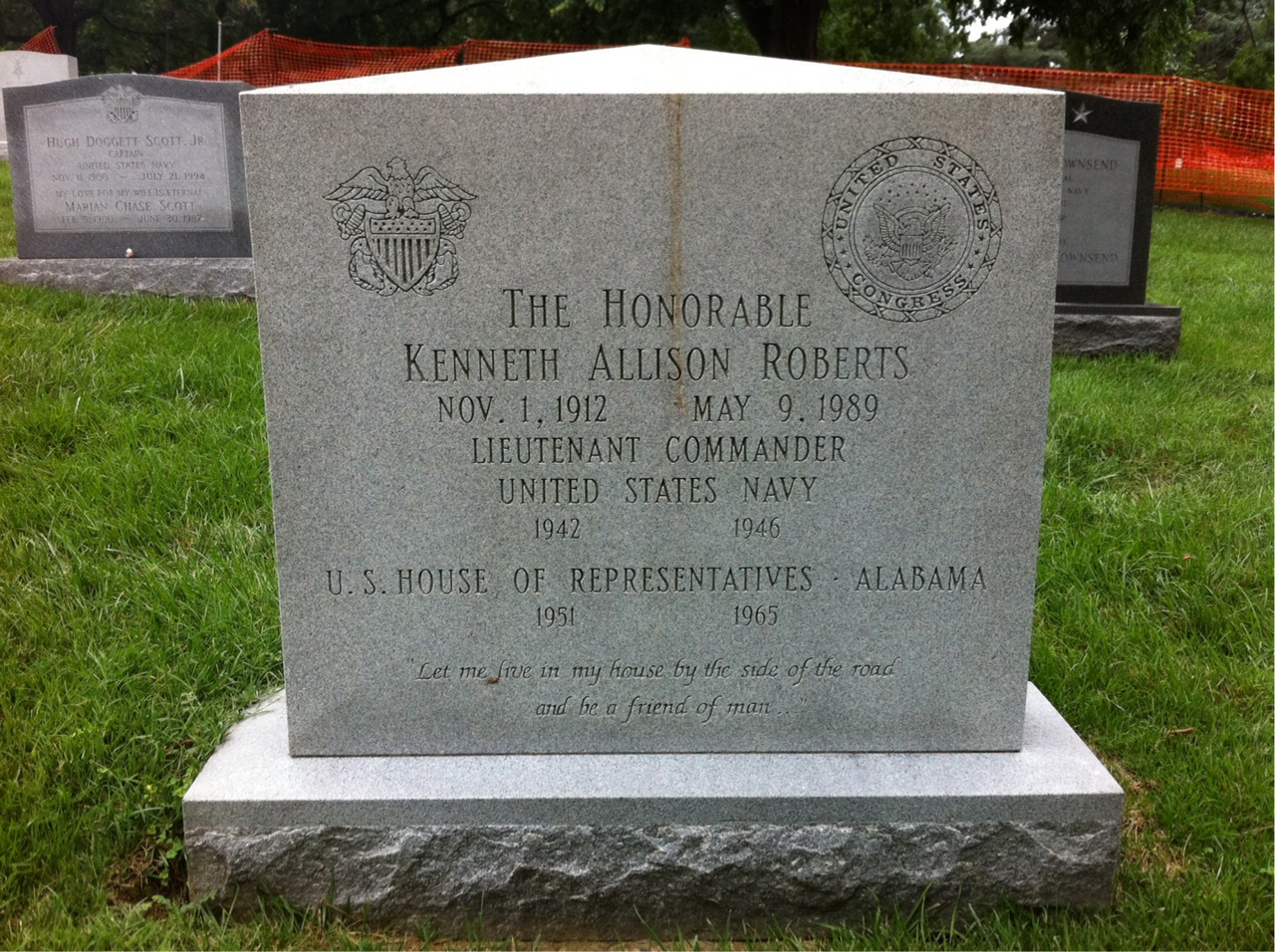
Grave at Arlington National Cemetery

=== Death and burial ===
He was a resident of Anniston, Alabama until his death due to congestive heart failure in Potomac, Maryland, on May 9, 1989. He was interred at Arlington National Cemetery.

== See also ==
- List of members of the United States Congress killed or wounded in office

== Bibliography ==
- United States Congress. "Kenneth A. Roberts (id: R000314)". Biographical Directory of the United States Congress.
- Heflin, Howell (June 21, 1989). "Tribute to Congressman Kenneth Roberts". Congressional Record - 101st Congress (1989-1990). Library of Congress.

U.S. House of Representatives
Preceded by Sam Hobbs	Member of the U.S. House of Representatives from Alabama's 4th congressional district 1951–1963	Succeeded by Glenn Andrews
Constituency reestablished	Member of the U.S. House of Representatives from Alabama's at-large congressional district 1963–1965	Constituency abolished
