= Bird J. Vincent =

American politician

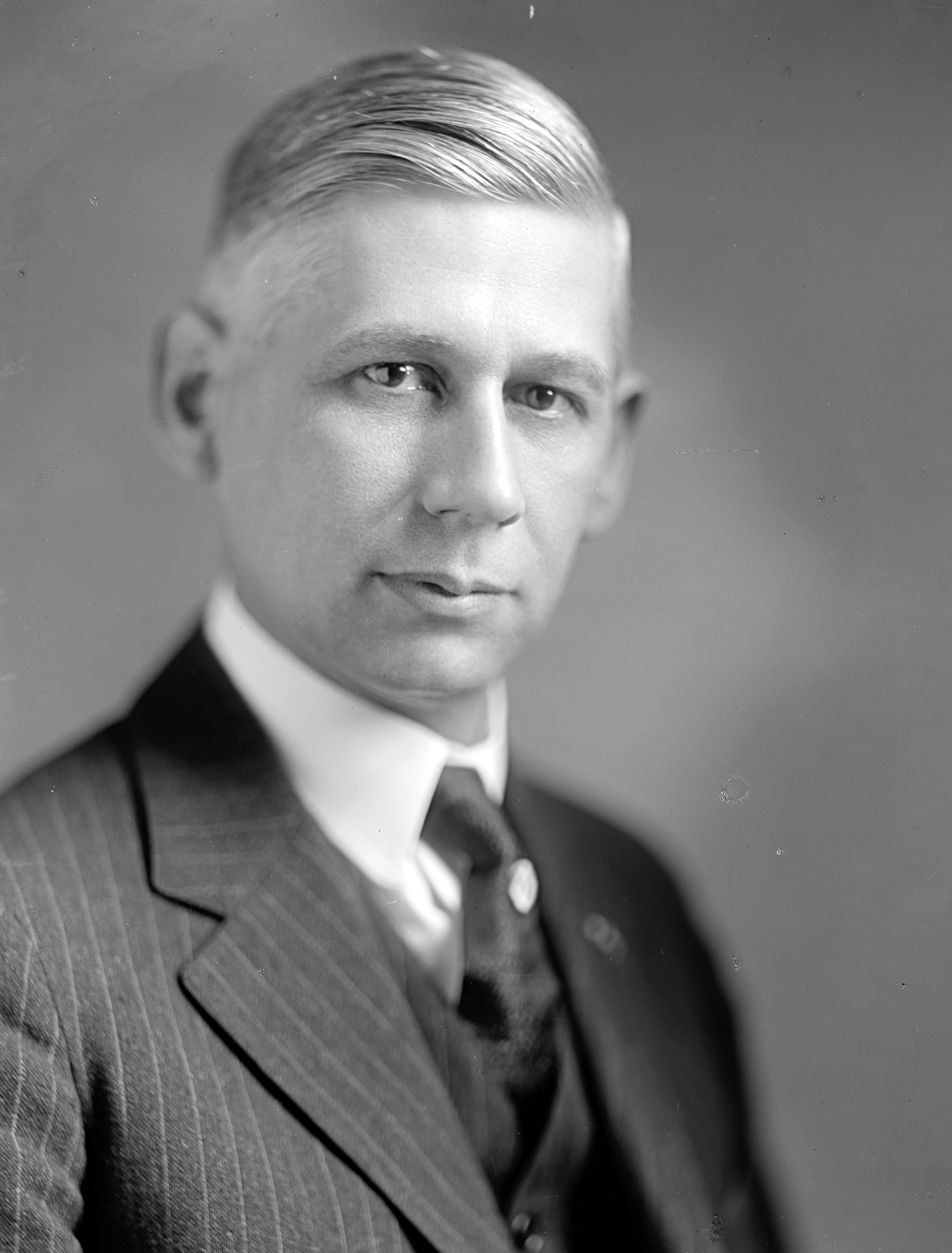

Member of the U.S. House of Representatives from Michigan's 8th district
- In office March 4, 1923 – July 18, 1931
- Preceded by: Joseph W. Fordney
- Succeeded by: Michael J. Hart

Personal details
- Born: Bird John Vincent; March 6, 1880 Brandon Township, Michigan
- Died: July 18, 1931 (aged 51) aboard USS Henderson, North Pacific Ocean
- Party: Republican
- Education: University of Michigan
- Occupation: Lawyer

Bird John Vincent (March 6, 1880 – July 18, 1931) was a soldier and politician from the U.S. state of Michigan.

== Early life ==
Vincent was born in Brandon Township near Clarkston, Michigan.

== Education ==
Vincent attended the public schools of Oakland and Midland Counties and Ferris Institute (now Ferris State University) in Mecosta County. He graduated from the law department of the University of Michigan at Ann Arbor in 1905, and was admitted to the bar the same year, and commenced practice in Saginaw.

== Career ==
He served as assistant prosecuting attorney of Saginaw County from 1909 to 1914 and prosecuting attorney from 1915 to 1917. In 1917, Vincent resigned to enter the Army. During World War I, he served ten months in France as a first lieutenant of the Sixth Train Headquarters and in the Three Hundred and Second Train Headquarters. After the war, he served as city attorney of Saginaw from 1919 to 1923. In 1922, Vincent was elected as a Republican from Michigan's 8th congressional district to the 68th Congress, and subsequently re-elected to the four succeeding Congressional terms, serving from March 4, 1923 until his death in 1931. He was chairman of the Committee on Elections No. 2 in the 69th and 71st Congresses.

== Death ==
Vincent died of heart disease, in office, while en route to San Francisco from Honolulu, Hawaii on board the transport USS Henderson. He interred in Forest Lawn Cemetery, Saginaw, Michigan.

== See also ==
- List of members of the United States Congress who died in office (1900–1949)

U.S. House of Representatives
Preceded by Joseph W. Fordney	United States Representative for the 8th congressional district of Michigan; 1923 – 1931	Succeeded by Michael J. Hart
