= Andres Figueroa Cordero =

Puerto Rican activist and militant

Andrés Figueroa Cordero
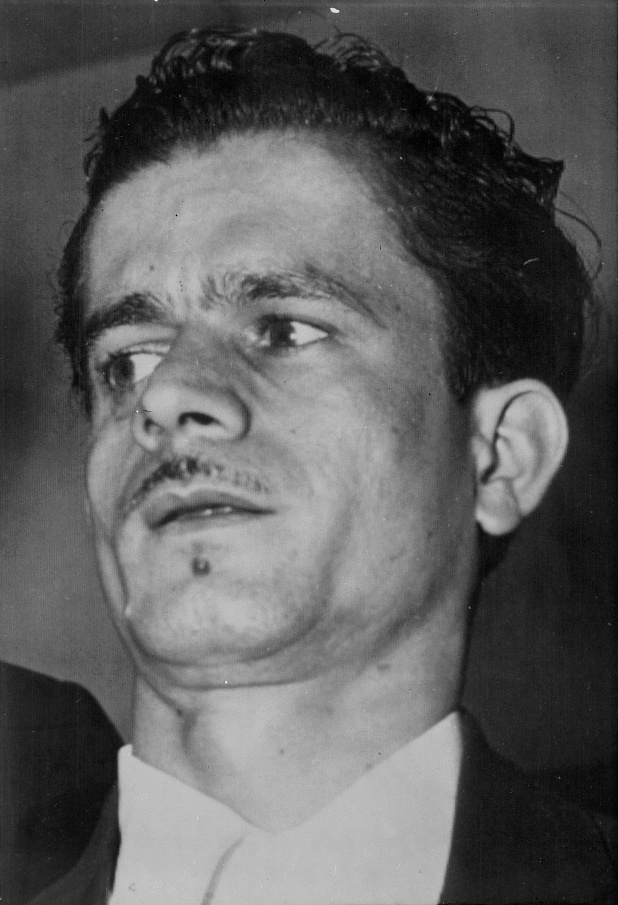
- Andrés Figueroa Cordero
- Born: November 29, 1924; Aguada, Puerto Rico
- Died: March 7, 1979 (aged 54); Aguada, Puerto Rico
- Political party: Puerto Rican Nationalist Party
- Movement: Puerto Rican Independence

Andrés Figueroa Cordero (November 29, 1924 – March 7, 1979) was a political activist, member of the Puerto Rican Nationalist Party and an advocate of Puerto Rican independence. On March 1, 1954, with fellow Nationalists Lolita Lebrón, Irvin Flores, and Rafael Cancel Miranda, he entered the United States Capitol building armed with automatic pistols; thirty shots were fired. Five congressmen were wounded but all survived. Figueroa Cordero, along with the other three members of his group, was immediately arrested.

== Early years ==
Figueroa Cordero was born into a poor family in the Barrio Lagunas in the town of Aguada in Puerto Rico. He quit school at an early age and went to work to help support his family.

== Puerto Rican Nationalist Party ==
The Puerto Rican Nationalist Party was founded by José Coll y Cuchí as a direct response to the American colonial government in 1919. By the 1920s, there were two other pro-independence organizations in the Island, they were the "Nationalist Youth" and the "'Independence Association of Puerto Rico". On September 17, 1922, the two political organizations merged into the Puerto Rican Nationalist Party. In 1924, Dr. Pedro Albizu Campos joined the party and on May 11, 1930, Albizu Campos was elected president of the Puerto Rican Nationalist Party.

There were sub-groups within the Puerto Rican Nationalist Party. The "Puerto Rican Youth for Independence" was one of them. Figueroa Cordero became a believer in the ideology which embraced Puerto Rican independence and joined the "Puerto Rican Youth for Independence" group. He later became a fully fledged member of the Puerto Rican Nationalist Party presided by Albizu Campos.

== New York City ==
On July 2, 1948, Figueroa Cordero decided to move to New York City in search of a job. He worked in a butcher shop, while at the same-time he continued to be a vocal advocate of the Puerto Rican independence cause. In New York, he became a member of the Nationalist Party branch of that city and befriended Lolita Lebrón and Rafael Cancel Miranda. He later met and befriended Irvin Flores who had moved to New York and had become a member of the New York Nationalist Party branch.

In 1954, Lebrón received a letter from Albizu Campos, in which he declared his intention to order attacks on "three locations, the most strategic to the enemy". Albizu Campos wanted Lebrón to pick a group of nationalists for this task without her personal participation. Lebrón presented the plan to the Nationalist Party in New York and choose Cancel Miranda, Flores and Figueroa Cordero for the task. Lebrón decided to lead the group despite the fact that Albizu Campos did not want her to be an active participant.

The pistols used in the attack were purchased by the Chicago Nationalist branch and sent to the New York branch. The New York branch not only provided the group with the weapons but, they also provided the funds for their railroad tickets. The date for the attack on the House of Representatives was to be March 1, 1954. This date was chosen because it coincided with the inauguration of the "Conferencia Interamericana" (Interamerican Conference) in Caracas. Lebrón had intended to call attention to Puerto Rico's independence cause, particularly among the Latin American countries participating in the conference.

== Assault on the House of Representatives ==
External videos
- Newsreel scenes in English of the attack on the U.S. Capitol by Flores, Lebrón, Cancel Miranda and Figueroa Cordero

Figueroa Cordero arrived with the group in Washington, D.C. and sat in the visitor's gallery in the House of Representatives. The representatives of the House were discussing Mexico's economy when suddenly Lebrón gave the order to the group to quickly recite the Lord's Prayer. She then stood up and shouted "¡Viva Puerto Rico Libre!" ("Long live a Free Puerto Rico!") and unfurled the flag of Puerto Rico. The group opened fire with semi-automatic pistols.

Although some 30 shots were fired (mostly by Cancel, according to his account), wounding five lawmakers; one representative, Alvin Morell Bentley from Michigan, was seriously wounded in the chest, Figueroa Cordero was unable to fire his gun because it was jammed. Upon being arrested, Lebrón yelled "I did not come to kill anyone, I came to die for Puerto Rico!"

== Arrest and trial ==
Lebrón, Cancel Miranda and Figueroa Cordero were immediately arrested. However, Flores walked away from the building in the confusion that followed. He took a taxi to a bus stop. There he was stopped and questioned together with various Mexicans who happened to be there, by the local police who had just heard about the shooting. They found a loose bullet in his pocket and arrested him.

Figueroa Cordero and his group were charged with attempted murder and other crimes. The trial began on June 4, 1954, with judge Alexander Holtzoff presiding over the case, under strict security measures. A jury composed of seven men and five women was assembled, their identities were kept secret by the media. The prosecution was led by Leo A. Rover, as part of this process 33 witnesses testified. Ruth Mary Reynolds, the "American/Puerto Rican Nationalist", with the aid of the American League for Puerto Rico's Independence, helped to defend the four shooters.

On July 13, 1954, the four nationalists were taken to New York, where they declared themselves not guilty on the charges of "trying to overthrow the government of the United States". On October 26, 1954, judge Lawrence E. Walsh found all of the accused guilty of conspiracy, sentencing them to six additional years in prison.

== Imprisonment and release ==
Figueroa Cordero was sent to the federal penitentiary in Atlanta, Georgia. While imprisoned he became sick and was diagnosed with terminal cancer. He was sent to the Federal Medical Center for Prisoners at Springfield, Missouri to receive medical treatment but it was futile. In 1978, President Carter commuted the sentences of Cancel Miranda, Lebrón, and Flores after they had served 25 years in prison. The Governor of Puerto Rico, Carlos Romero Barceló, publicly opposed the commutations granted by Carter, stating that it would encourage terrorism and undermine public safety. The three released former prisoners received heroes welcomes by their supporters upon their return to Puerto Rico. The presidential clemency read as follows:

The President today granted clemency to Andres Figueroa Cordero, convicted in 1954 along with three other Puerto Ricans in connection with the shooting and wounding of several Congressmen.
The President commuted his sentence to the time served.
Mr. Cordero has terminal cancer. The President commuted Mr. Cordero's sentence on humanitarian grounds because of his physical condition.
Mr. Cordero was convicted of assault and conspiracy to overthrow the Government and was serving a 25- to 75-year sentence. He would not have been eligible for parole until 1981.
The commutation order, which is not a pardon, was an act of clemency on the part of the President.
Mr. Cordero was expected to be released from the Federal Medical Center for Prisoners at Springfield, Mo., within 24 hours.

== Later years ==
After his release, Figueroa Cordero continued to serve as an independence advocate. He was also an active participant in the struggle for the prison release of his group Lolita Lebrón, Rafael Cancel Miranda and Irvin Flores. In an interview, he made the following statement: "I would do it half a million times if had to. To save your country, there is no other recourse than to give your life."

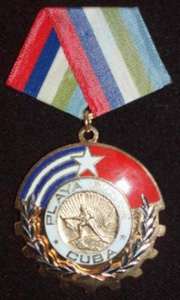
The Order of Playa Girón

On July 23, 1978, Figueroa Cordero traveled to Cuba to receive treatment for his illness in that country's Fajardo Hospital. During his stay in the hospital he was awarded the Pablo de la Torriente Brau Medal by the Cuban Communist Youth and was visited by Fidel Castro.

Figueroa Cordero returned to his hometown in Puerto Rico where he died on March 7, 1979. He is buried in the Municipal Cemetery of Aguada. The local municipal government honored his memory with the unveiling of a bust in his likeness located in the carretera PR 416.

In 1979, Figueroa Cordero was posthumously awarded the Order of Playa Girón. The Order of Playa Girón is a national order conferred by the Council of State of Cuba on Cubans or foreigners.

== See also ==
- List of Puerto Ricans
- Boricua Popular Army
- Fuerzas Armadas de Liberación Nacional (Puerto Rico)
