= Alvin Morell Bentley =

American politician (1918–1969)

Alvin Bentley
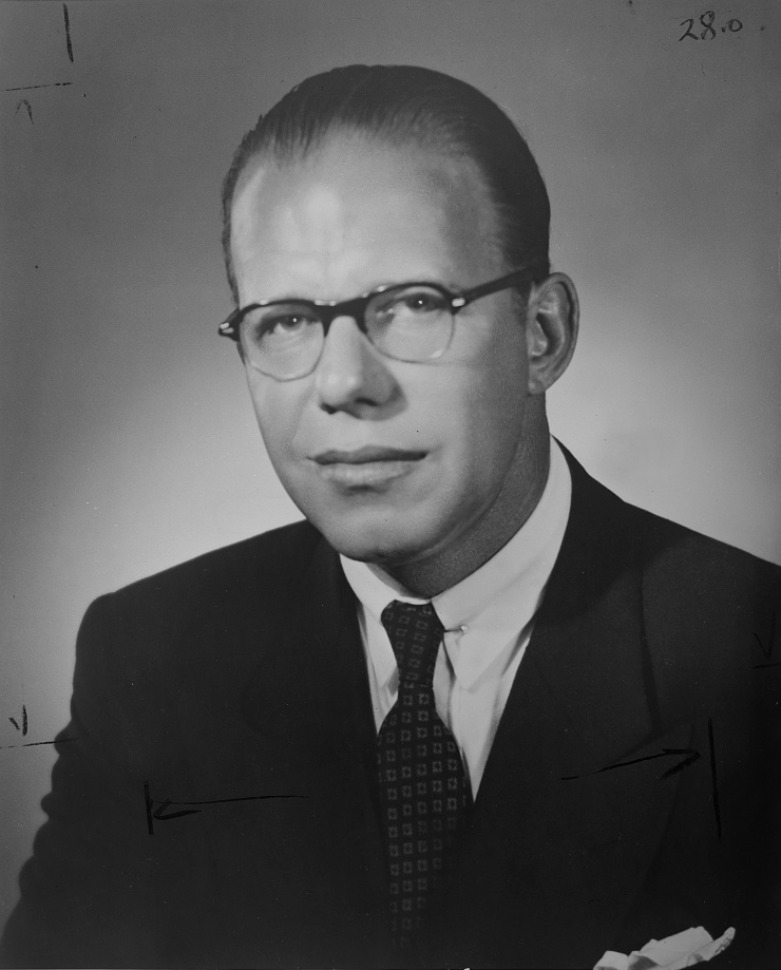
- Bentley in 1958

Member of the U.S. House of Representatives from Michigan's 8th district
- In office January 3, 1953 – January 3, 1961
- Preceded by: Fred L. Crawford
- Succeeded by: James Harvey

Personal details
- Born: Alvin Morell Bentley III; August 30, 1918 Portland, Maine, U.S.
- Died: April 10, 1969 (aged 50) Tucson, Arizona, U.S.
- Party: Republican
- Education: University of Michigan (BA, MA)

Alvin Morell Bentley III (August 30, 1918 – April 10, 1969) was an American politician from the U.S. state of Michigan. As a four-term a U.S. representative from 1953 to 1961, he made national headlines as one of the wounded of the 1954 United States Capitol shooting.

== Early years ==
Bentley, the only child of Alvin M. Bentley Jr., and Helen Webb Bentley, was born in Portland, Maine, only three months before his father died serving in France during World War I. Although fatherless, Bentley was heir to a family fortune, from his grandfather who founded the Owosso Manufacturing Company.

He graduated in 1934 from Southern Pines High School in Southern Pines, North Carolina, and in 1936 from Asheville Prep School in Asheville, North Carolina. He received his bachelor's degree in 1940 from the University of Michigan and attended Turner's Diplomatic School, Washington, D.C., to qualify for the U.S. diplomatic service.

== Government service ==
He served as vice consul and secretary with the United States Foreign Service, serving in Mexico (1942–1944), Colombia (1945–1946), Hungary (1947–1949), and Italy (1949–1950). He returned to Washington, D.C., on March 15, 1950, for work in the State Department.

Disagreeing with the Truman administration's foreign policy, Bentley resigned from the diplomatic service in 1950 and returned to live in Owosso, Michigan. He was a delegate to Republican State conventions in 1950, 1951, and 1952. He was vice president of Lake Huron Broadcasting Company, Saginaw, Michigan, starting in 1952, and a director of Mitchell-Bentley Corporation.

In 1952, Bentley defeated the incumbent Republican U.S. Representative Fred L. Crawford in the primary election for Michigan's 8th congressional district and went on to win in the 1952 general election. Bentley was elected to the Eighty-third and to the three succeeding Congresses, serving from January 3, 1953, to January 3, 1961. Bentley voted present on the Civil Rights Act of 1957 and voted in favor of the Civil Rights Act of 1960. He was not a candidate for re-nomination in 1960, instead running for a seat in the United States Senate and losing to Democratic incumbent Patrick V. McNamara in the 1960 general election.

=== 1954 House shooting incident ===
Bentley was one of five Representatives shot in the March 1, 1954 United States Capitol shooting, when four Puerto Rican nationalists opened fire from the visitors' balcony into the chamber of the United States House of Representatives. Bentley was shot in the chest and abdomen but survived.

== Career during the 1960s ==
From 1961 to 1962, Bentley was a delegate from the 15th Senatorial District to the Michigan State Constitutional Convention, which produced the Michigan state constitution adopted in 1963. In 1962, Bentley again ran for the U.S. House for a one-term, at-large seat created as a result of the 1960 U.S. census, but he lost in the general election to Democrat Neil Staebler. He continued public service by receiving appointments to education-related positions in the state. Also, after leaving Congress in 1961, he had returned to the University of Michigan as a graduate student in the History department.

Alvin M. Bentley served on the board of directors for the National Conference on Citizenship in 1960.

While continuing to maintain offices in Washington, D.C., Bentley commuted by air to Ann Arbor to attend classes. He received an M.A. degree in 1963. In 1966, while pursuing a doctoral degree, Governor George W. Romney appointed him to the board of regents of the University of Michigan.

== Philanthropy ==
In 1961, Bentley established the Alvin M. Bentley Foundation to support educational, scientific, and charitable projects. Through the foundation, Bentley continues to foster academic excellence in the state of Michigan.

In 1983, the foundation established the Bentley Scholarships at the University of Michigan for Michigan residents who have demonstrated academic excellence and promise. The foundation also sponsors Operation Bentley, "a week-long intensive academic program held at Albion College for high school juniors who have been selected to participate in a rigorous and rewarding study of local, state, and national politics."

In 1967, he contributed money to the University of Michigan to establish an endowed professorship in the Department of History in memory of his parents.

In the mid-1960s, Bentley served as chairman of the Michigan Freedom from Hunger Council, a humanitarian organization set up to gather, interpret, and disseminate information about hunger problems in the world, especially in the Western Hemisphere. Bentley also chaired the Michigan branch of the Partners of the Alliance, an organization that had begun nationally in 1964, to act as a channel through which civic clubs, unions, business and professional groups, schools, and individuals could work directly with groups, villages, or areas in Latin America to improve the way of life in that particular area. The objective was not charity, but the promotion of self-help programs. The State of Michigan took British Honduras (Belize) as its partner.

== Death and burial ==
He died on April 10, 1969, at the age of 50, while on vacation in Tucson, Arizona, of an "inflammation affecting the central nervous system". Bentley had been using a wheelchair for two years after "corrective surgery" when his condition suddenly worsened. He is interred in Oak Hill Cemetery in Owosso, Michigan.

In 1971, his widow, Arvella D. Bentley, gave a generous donation to the University of Michigan's "Michigan Historical Collections", enabling it to construct a new building which was subsequently renamed the Bentley Historical Library.

U.S. House of Representatives
Preceded by Fred L. Crawford	Member of the U.S. House of Representatives from Michigan's 8th congressional district 1953–1961	Succeeded by James Harvey
Party political offices
Preceded by Homer S. Ferguson	Republican nominee for U.S. Senator from Michigan (Class 2); 1960	Succeeded by Robert P. Griffin
