= Cadets of the Republic =

Youth organization of the Puerto Rican Nationalist Party

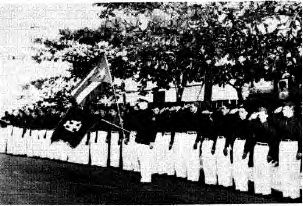
- Raimundo Díaz Pacheco commanding the Nationalist Cadets
- Allegiance: Puerto Rico; Puerto Rican Nationalist Party
- Conflicts: Puerto Rican Nationalist Party Revolts of the 1950s: San Juan Nationalist revolt

Cadets of the Republic, known in Spanish as Cadetes de la República, was the paramilitary wing of the Puerto Rican Nationalist Party in the twentieth century. The organization was also referred to as the Liberation Army of Puerto Rico (Ejército Libertador de Puerto Rico).

The Cadets of the Republic were founded and organized in the 1930s by Dr. Pedro Albizu Campos, the president of the Puerto Rican Nationalist Party. Some members of the cadets participated in the Puerto Rican Nationalist Party revolts of the 1950s against United States colonial rule.

The following is a brief history of the Cadets of the Republic, covering the period from 1930 to 1950.

== Origins ==
In the 1920s, there was a non-political student organization in the University of Puerto Rico called Patriotas Jóvenes (Young Patriots). By the 1930s many students, who were also members of the Puerto Rican Nationalist Party and influenced by the teachings of Albizu Campos, joined the Patriotas Jóvenes organization. The Patriotas adopted the Nationalist Party's independence ideals and dismissed any student who would not swear allegiance to them. The organization was later renamed Cadetes de la República (Cadets of the Republic) and Joaquín Rodríguez, a Nationalist, was placed in charge.

== Organizational structure ==
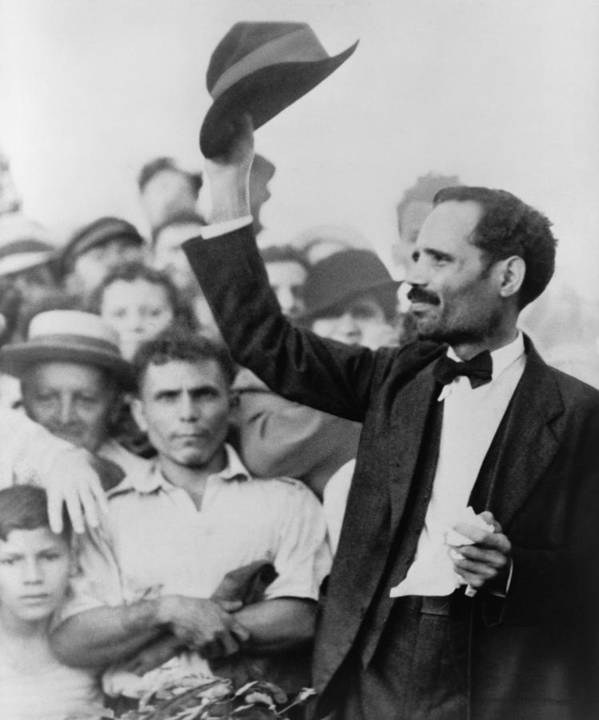
Don Pedro Albizu Campos, 1936

By order of Albizu Campos, the cadets adopted a military structure with companies in various towns of the island. Albizu Campos, who had served as a Lieutenant in the United States Army during World War I, believed that the cadets had to adopt a system of strict military training if they were to become a powerful Puerto Rican Army. He believed that a well-trained and disciplined army would eventually be able to fight against the United States imperialism which ruled the island. Albizu Campos often referred to the cadets as the Ejército Libertador de Puerto Rico (The Liberation Army of Puerto Rico).

Cadet headquarters were located at Número 11 de la Calle del Cristo in Old San Juan. The cadet organization was divided into companies throughout the cities and towns of Arecibo, Cabo Rojo, Cayey, Dorado, Guayama, Humacao, Isabela, Jayuya, Lares, Mayagüez, Naranjito, Ponce, Sabana Grande, San Germán, San Juan, San Lorenzo, San Sebastián and Utuado. San Juan was the only city with more than one cadet corps. Besides the main city, San Juan also had a cadets corps in the sectors of Hato Rey, Santurce and Río Piedras.

== Chain of Command ==
The cadets had a chain of command which had to be followed. Regular cadets were First and Second Class Soldiers, and larger companies had Sergeants. The Commanding Officer of each company held the rank of Captain, who reported to a Sub-Commander with the rank of Colonel, who in turn reported to the Commander-in-Chief. The Commander-in-Chief reported only to the President of the Nationalist Party.

== Numbers ==
Cadet recruitment was the responsibility of each Captain. United States government reports showed that by the mid-1930s, cadet membership was growing exponentially - particularly amongst younger members, aged 18 through 25. The female members of the Nationalist Party had their own organization, known as the Hijas de la Libertad (Daughters of Freedom). It is estimated by the FBI and El Mundo newspaper that at its peak, around 1935–36, cadet membership reached over 10,000.

== Oath ==
Puerto Rican Nationalist Party Flag

The Cross potent

Cadet candidates were taught the ideals of the party by the Nationalist Municipal Board President. They were then required to take an oath of allegiance to the PRNP. During the verbal oath ceremony the cadets had to place a hand on the Nationalist flag, which was itself symbolic.

The flag showed a white Calatrava Cross, also known as the Cross potent on the middle of a black background. The Cross of Calatrava was first used by the Crusaders of Calatrava and later by the French revolutionists. The black background symbolized the mourning of the Puerto Rican Nation in colonial captivity.

Cadets swore to be faithful to the Nationalist Party and to participate in public activities organized by the party. Contrary to what is believed, they did not swear to overthrow the Government of the United States. They did, however, swear to fight for Puerto Rico's independence from colonial rule by whatever means necessary.

== Uniforms ==
All of the Cadets were required to wear uniforms during the celebration of Nationalist activities. These uniforms consisted of white trousers, black shirt, black tie, and an overseas cap. The shirt and cap were both emblazoned with a Cross of Calatrava patch. Cadet officers wore an additional black seam on the trousers and a white headquarters cap. Cadets who could not afford to buy the entire uniform wore white trousers with a black shirt.

== Drills and tactics ==
The cadets practiced military drills and were taught military tactics. They used wooden rifles during their training. During the participation of public activities, each cadet company had two standard bearers. One carried the Flag of Puerto Rico, the other carried the Nationalist Party Flag.

== Historical events (1930 -1950) ==
=== Río Piedras massacre ===
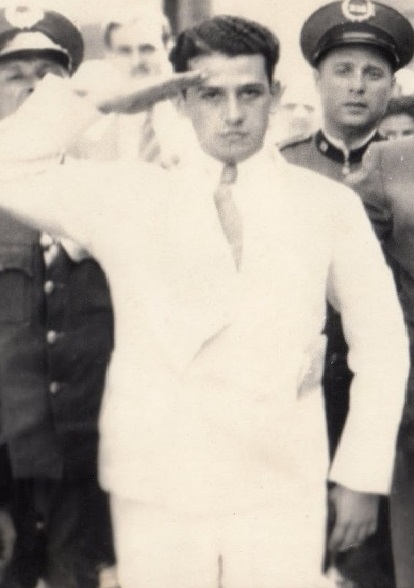
Elias Beauchamp gives a cadet military salute, moments before being summarily executed at police headquarters

On October 24, 1935, local police officers confronted and opened fire on supporters of the Puerto Rican Nationalist Party at the University of Puerto Rico. Four Nationalist Party members were killed and one police officer was wounded during the shooting known as the Río Piedras massacre.

Isolina Rondón watched from her front door on Calle Brumbaugh, near the University of Puerto Rico, as the police shot into the car carrying the four Nationalists. Rondón testified how she saw the police officers shooting at the victims and how she heard one police officer screaming "Do not to let them escape alive". However, her testimony was ignored and there were no charges raised against the officers. They were instead given a promotion.

At the time of the massacre the top-ranking police chief on the island was appointed by the American government—a former U.S. Army Colonel named Elisha Francis Riggs. Since the entire Insular Police took their orders from Riggs the Nationalists considered him responsible for the massacre.

On February 23, 1936, Riggs was assassinated by Nationalists Hiram Rosado and Elías Beauchamp, both members of the Cadets, on his way home after attending Mass in San Juan's Cathedral. Rosado and Beauchamp were arrested and executed without a trial at the police headquarters in San Juan but not before Beauchamp posed solemnly for a news photographer with a stiff military salute.

=== Arrest of Albizu Campos ===
On April 3, 1936, a Federal Grand Jury submitted accusations against Pedro Albizu Campos, Juan Antonio Corretjer, Luis F. Velázquez, Clemente Soto Vélez and the following members of the cadets: Erasmo Velázquez, Julio H. Velázquez, Rafael Ortiz Pacheco, Juan Gallardo Santiago, and Pablo Rosado Ortiz.

These men all were charged with sedition and other violations of Title 18 of the United States Code. Title 18 of the United States Code is the criminal and penal code of the federal government of the United States. It deals with federal crimes and criminal procedure.

By way of evidence, the prosecution referred to the creation, organization and the activities of the cadets, which the government made reference to as the "Liberting Army of Puerto Rico." The government prosecutors alleged that the military tactics which the cadets were being taught, was for the sole purpose of overthrowing the Government of the U.S. A jury of seven Puerto Ricans and five Americans voted 7-to-5 not guilty. However, Judge Robert A. Cooper called for a new jury, this time composed of ten Americans and two Puerto Ricans, and a guilty verdict was achieved.

=== The Ponce massacre ===
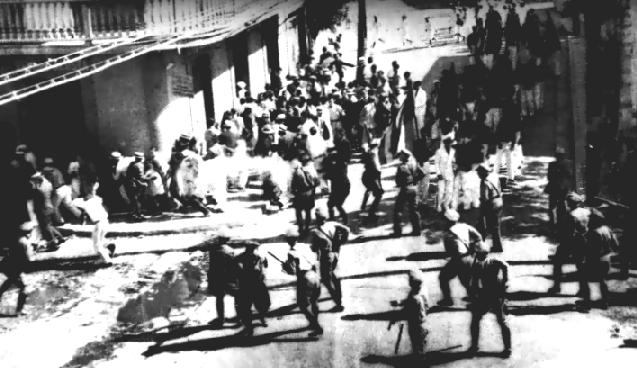
Carlos Torres Morales, a photojournalist for the newspaper El Imparcial, was covering the march and took this photograph when the shooting began. The photo was sent to the U.S. Congress.

March 21, 1937, a Palm Sunday, the cadets were scheduled to participate in a peaceful march in the city of Ponce. The march had been organized by the Nationalist Party to commemorate the ending of slavery in Puerto Rico by the governing Spanish National Assembly in 1873. The march was also protesting the imprisonment, by the U.S. government, of Nationalist leader Albizu Campos on the alleged sedition charges.

External videos
- You may watch newsreel scenes of the Ponce massacre here

Raimundo Díaz Pacheco, who by then was the Comandante (Commander) of the Cadets of the Republic, and his brother Faustino were present when the peaceful march turned into a bloody police slaughter, which became known as the Ponce massacre.

Several days before the scheduled Palm Sunday march, Casimiro Berenguer, a military instructor of the cadets, and other organizers received legal permits for the peaceful protest from José Tormos Diego, the mayor of Ponce. However, upon learning of the planned protest, the colonial governor of Puerto Rico at the time, General Blanton Winship (who had been appointed by US president Franklin Delano Roosevelt) demanded the immediate withdrawal of the permits.

Without notice to the organizers, or any opportunity to appeal or any time to arrange an alternate venue, the permits were abruptly withdrawn just before the protest was scheduled to begin.

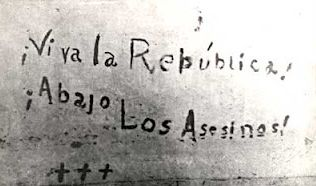
"Viva la Republica, Abajo los Asesinos" message which cadet Bolívar Márquez Telechea wrote with his blood before he died

Tomas López de Victoria, who at the time was the Captain of the Ponce branch of the cadets, ordered the band to play La Borinqueña, Puerto Rico's national anthem. As the anthem was being played, the demonstrators—which included the Cadets and the women's branch of the Nationalist Party known as the Hijas de la Libertad (Daughters of Freedom)—began to march.

Empowered by the American police chief, and encouraged by the governor, the police fired for over fifteen minutes from four different positions. They fired with impunity on cadets and bystanders alike—killing men, women and children.

The flag-bearer of the cadets was shot and killed during the massacre. A young girl by the name of Carmen Fernández proceeded to take the flag but was shot and gravely injured. A young cadet by the name of Bolívar Márquez Telechea, despite being mortally wounded, dragged himself to a wall and wrote with his blood the following message before he succumbed to his wounds:

"Viva la República, Abajo los asesinos!"
("Long live the Republic, Down with the Murderers!"))

Nineteen people were killed and about 235 were wounded. The dead included seventeen men, one woman, and a seven-year-old girl. Some of the dead were demonstrators while others were simply passers-by. Many were chased by the police and shot or clubbed at the entrance of their houses as they tried to escape. Others were taken from their hiding places and killed. Leopold Tormes, a member of the Puerto Rico legislature, told reporters how a policeman murdered a nationalist with his bare hands. Dr. Jose N. Gándara, one of the physicians who assisted the wounded, testified that wounded people running away were shot and that many were again wounded by the clubs and bare fists of the police. No arms were found in the hands of the civilians and cadets who were wounded nor on the dead. About 150 of the demonstrators were arrested immediately afterward; they were later released on bail.

=== The Judge Cooper incident ===
On June 7, 1937, Albizu Campos and the other leaders of the Nationalist Party were transferred to the Federal Penitentiary in Atlanta, Georgia by order of federal Judge Robert A. Cooper. The next day Díaz Pacheco participated in an assassination attempt on Judge Cooper in believing that Cooper rigged the jury made up of ten United States citizens and two Puerto Ricans, and for sentencing the Nationalist leadership to prison terms. Díaz Pacheco, together with nine other Cadets and Nationalists, was arrested and accused of attempting against the life of Judge Cooper. On October 22, 1937, U.S. President Franklin D. Roosevelt signed Executive Order Number 7731 designating Martín Travieso, Associate Justice of the Supreme Court of Puerto Rico, to perform and discharge the duties of Judge of the District Court of the United States for Puerto Rico in the trial against the Nationalists thereby permitting Judge Cooper to serve as a Government witness. Díaz Pacheco and his comrades were found guilty of the charges against them and were imprisoned.

=== Attempt against Governor Winship ===
On July 25, 1938, Governor Winship chose the city of Ponce for a military parade in commemoration of the 1898 invasion of Puerto Rico by the United States. He wanted to prove that his "Law and Order" policy had been a successful one against the Nationalists, a decision that would prove to be disastrous.

During the parade, a hail of bullets was fired toward the grandstand in an attempt to assassinate Governor Winship. Winship escaped unscathed in what was the first time in Puerto Rican history that an attempt was made on a governor's life.

The dead included Nationalist Cadet Ángel Esteban Antongiorgi and National Guard Colonel Luis Irizarry while thirty-six other people were wounded. Despite the Nationalist Party's disavowal of any participation in the attack, several Nationalists were arrested and nine were accused of "murder and conspiracy to incite violence." Among the nine Nationalists accused was the Captain of the Ponce branch of the Cadets Tomás López de Victoria and fellow Cadets Elifaz Escobar, Santiago González Castro, Juan Pietri and Prudencio Segarra. They served eight years in the State Penitentiary of Puerto Rico. However, since the government's actions against them were unjust, Governor Rexford Guy Tugwell had no other choice but to pardon them.

Winship proceeded to declare war against the Nationalists, in response to which Jaime Benítez Rexach, a student at the University of Chicago at the time, wrote a letter to President Roosevelt which in part read as follows: "The point I am to make is that the Governor (Winship) himself through his military approach to things has helped keep Puerto Rico in an unnecessary state of turmoil. He seems to think that the political problem of Puerto Rico limits itself to a fight between himself and the Nationalists, that no holds are barred in that fight and that everybody else should keep out. As a matter of fact he has played the Nationalist game and they have played his.

=== Puerto Rico's Gag Law (Law 53) ===
After Díaz Pacheco was released from prison he resumed his role as Commander of the Cadets. Unbeknown to him, his brother Faustino had abandoned the Nationalist Party in 1939 and had turned into an informant for the FBI.

Albizu Campos returned to Puerto Rico in 1947 after having been incarcerated for ten years in Atlanta, Georgia and Díaz Pacheco and the Cadets were among those who greeted him. Albizu Campos named Díaz Pacheco Treasurer General of the party. Thus, Díaz Pacheco now served as both, Comandante (Commander) of the Cadets of the Republic and as Treasurer General of the party. As Treasurer General he was responsible for all the funds received by the municipal treasurers of the party.

On May 21, 1948, the Puerto Rican legislature, which was presided over by Luis Muñoz Marín approved Law 53. The law which is also known as Ley de la Mordaza or Puerto Rico's Gag Law was signed into law on June 10, 1948, by the U.S.-appointed governor Jesús T. Piñero. The law's main objective was to suppress the independence movement in Puerto Rico. The law made it a crime to own or display a Puerto Rican flag, to sing a patriotic tune, to speak or write of independence, or meet with anyone, or hold any assembly, with regard to the political status of Puerto Rico.

=== Nationalist Party Revolts of the 1950s ===
Membership in the cadets began to dwindle as a result of the persecution which the cadets were subject to by local and federal agencies of United States. In the 1950s the official hierarchy of the Cadets of the Republic was the following:

Name of Cadet	Rank and Company
Raimundo Díaz Pacheco	Commander-in-Chief
Tomás López de Victoria	Colonel/Sub-Commander
Juan Jaca Hernández	Captain of Arecibo
José Antonio Vélez Lugo	Captain of Mayagüez
Ramón Pedroza Rivera	Captain of Ponce
Fernando Lebrón	Captain of Río Piedras
Antonio Colón Save	Captain of Santurce
Heriberto Castro Ríos	Captain of Utuado

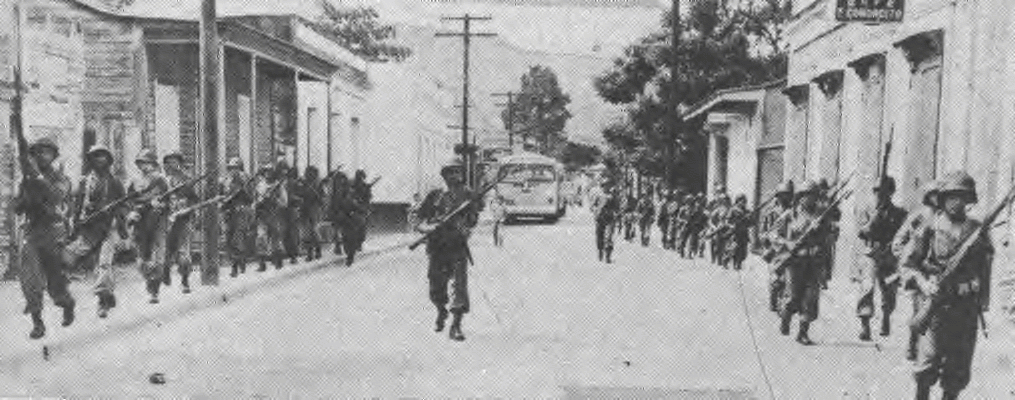
The National Guard occupy Jayuya

Various incidents between the government and the party led to a call for an armed revolt by the Puerto Rican Nationalist Party against United States Government rule over Puerto Rico.

The revolts specifically repudiated the so-called Free Associated State (Estado Libre Asociado) designation of Puerto Rico—a designation widely recognized as a colonial farce.

The revolts, known as the Puerto Rican Nationalist Party Revolts of the 1950s, began on October 30, 1950, upon the orders of Nationalist leader Albizu Campos, with uprisings in various towns, among them Arecibo, Mayagüez, Naranjito, Peñuelas and Ponce. The most notable uprisings occurred in Utuado, Jayuya, and San Juan.

It was estimated by the FBI that 40 percent of the Cadet membership participated in the revolts. They participated in every incident of the revolts. However, among the more notable incidents in which the Cadets were involved were the following:

Arecibo Incident
López de Victoria led the revolt, which is referred to by the FBI as the "Arecibo Incident", in the town of Arecibo. He ordered Ismael Díaz Matos, a Nationalist leader in Arecibo, to attack the local police station. Díaz Matos did as commanded and killed four policemen before fleeing. Fellow Nationalist Hipólito Miranda Díaz was killed while he covered the escape of his comrades. Díaz Matos and his group were captured and arrested by the National Guard. Among the Cadets arrested who were charged with organizing the attack were López de Victoria and Juan Jaca Hernández, Cadet Captain of Arecibo.

Mayagüez Incident
The Nationalist group of Mayagüez was one of the largest. The Cadet Captain was José Antonio Vélez Lugo. It was divided into several units, each assigned to attack different targets. One of the groups attacked the town's police station, resulting in the death of three policemen and three bystanders.

The unit then joined the members of the other units in Barrio La Quinta. Upon the arrival of the local police they headed into the mountains and avoided further casualties through adroit use of guerrilla tactics. Vélez Lugo was eventually captured and charged with attempted murder.

One of the members of these units was Nationalist cadet Irvin Flores Rodríguez, who on March 1, 1954, together with Lolita Lebrón, Rafael Cancel Miranda and Andrés Figueroa Cordero, attacked the members of the US House of Representatives in Washington, DC with automatic pistols.

Ponce Incident
Police Corporal Aurelio Miranda approached a car carrying some Nationalists. Fellow officers suggested they arrest them right there. Officer Miranda was shot dead in a firefight between the Nationalists and the police. Antonio Alicea, José Miguel Alicea, Francisco Campos (Albizu Campos' nephew), Osvaldo Pérez Martínez and Ramón Pedrosa Rivera, Captain of the Ponce Cadets, were arrested and accused of the murder of Corporal Miranda during the revolt. Raúl de Jesús was accused of violation of the Insular Firearms Law.

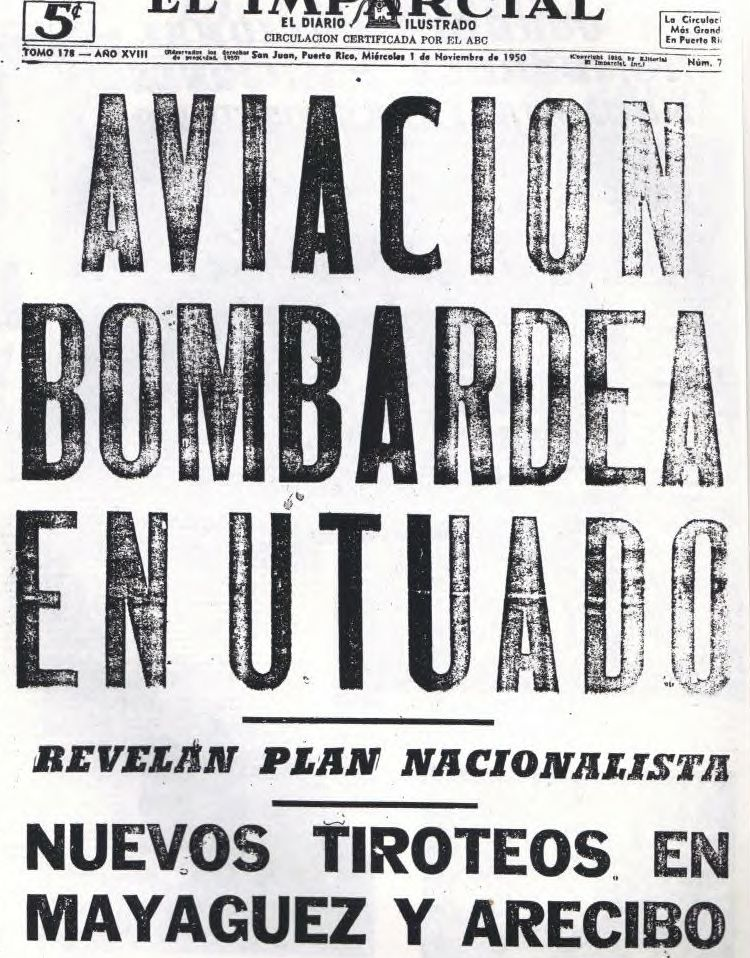
El Imparcial headline: "Aviation (US) bombs Utuado"

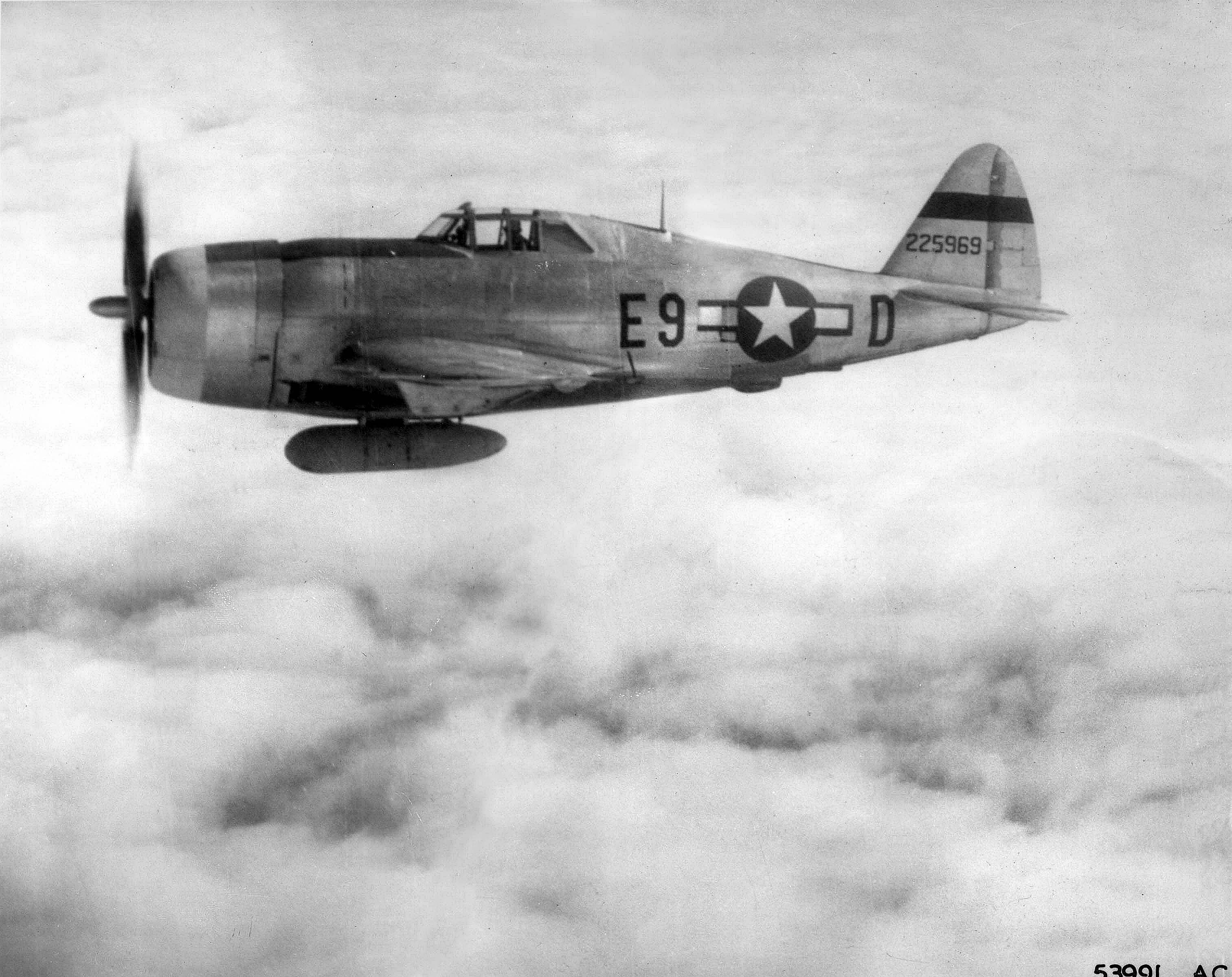
P-47 Thunderbolt—the military aircraft used by the United States to bomb Jayuya and Utuado

Utuado Uprising
The revolt in the town of Utuado culminated in the Utuado massacre. In Utuado a group of thirty-two Nationalists fought against the local police. The group was reduced to twelve men and retreated to the house of Damián Torres—which was promptly strafed by 50-caliber machinegun fire, from four American P-47 Thunderbolt planes. Three men died from this aerial gunfire.

The National Guard arrived later that day and ordered the nine men who survived the attack to surrender. Once the nationalists surrendered they were forced to march down Dr. Cueto Street to the local town plaza where their shoes, belts and personal belongings were removed.

The group then was taken behind the police station and where, without a trial, they were machine-gunned. Four of the nationalists died. They were nationalists Ríos, Julio Colón Feliciano, Agustín Quiñones Mercado, Antonio Ramos and Antonio González.

González, who was 17 years old, pleaded for water and instead was bayoneted to death. The five survivors were seriously wounded in what became known as La Masacre de Utuado (The Utuado Massacre).

In addition to the three men killed by the P-47 Thunderbolt planes, these four aircraft inflicted massive damage to the houses, buildings and roads of both Jayuya and Utuado.

Each plane was heavily armed with eight .50-caliber machine guns, four on each wing. They also carried rockets that were five inches wide, and bomb loads of 2,500 pounds. This entire arsenal was unleashed on the towns of Jayuya and Utuado.

Jayuya Uprising
The revolt in the town of Jayuya, led by Blanca Canales, was one of the most notable uprisings of October 30, 1950. It may possibly have been the first time a woman has led a revolt against the United States. In the town square, Canales gave a speech and declared Puerto Rico a free Republic. The town was attacked from the air with P-47 U.S. bomber planes and on land with heavy artillery. The town was held by the Nationalists for three days.

=== San Juan Nationalist revolt ===
Díaz Pacheco was in charge of the group involved in the San Juan revolt. The objective of the revolt was to assassinate the Governor of Puerto Rico Luis Muñoz Marín, at his residence La Fortaleza.

Early in the morning of October 30, fellow cadets Domingo Hiraldo Resto, Carlos Hiraldo Resto, Gregorio Hernández and Manuel Torres Medina met at the house of Díaz Pacheco, in the San Juan sector of Martín Peña. At 11 A.M., they boarded a green Plymouth and headed towards Old San Juan. The men arrived at La Fortaleza at noon and stopped their car 25 feet from their objective's main entrance They got out of the car with a submachine gun and pistols in hand and immediately began firing at the mansion. Díaz Pacheco headed towards the mansion while the others took cover close to their car, and fired pistols from their positions.

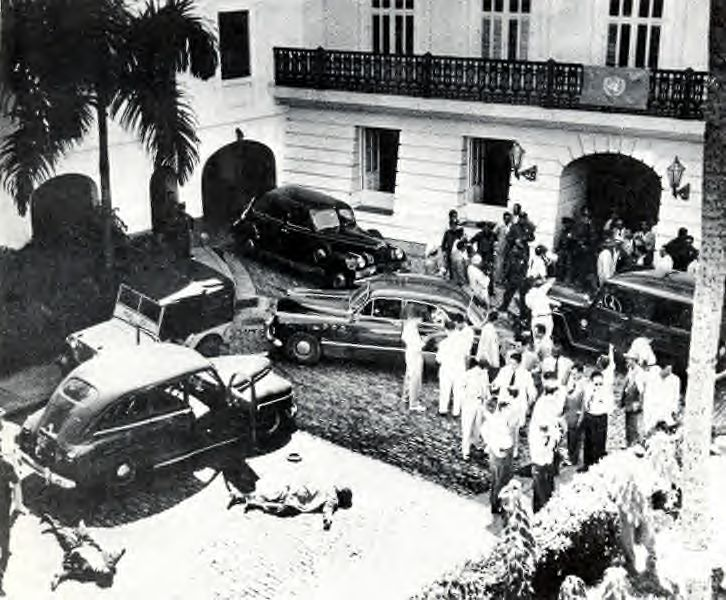
The bodies of Carlos Hiraldo Resto and Manuel Torres Medina lie on the ground, after their attack on La Fortaleza

The Fortaleza guards and police, who knew of the planned attack thanks to a double agent name E. Rivera Orellana, were already in defensive positions and returned fire.

Díaz Pacheco aimed his sub-machine gun fire at the second floor of the mansion, where the executive offices of Governor Muñoz Marín were located. During the firefight Díaz Pacheco wounded two police officers, Isidoro Ramos and Vicente Otero Díaz, before he was killed by Fortaleza guard Carmelo Dávila.

Meanwhile, the police continued to fire upon the other Nationalists. Domingo Hiraldo Resto was seriously wounded, but despite his wounds he dragged himself towards the mansion's entrance. He was able to reach the mansion's main door and once there he was motionless and appeared to be dead. He suddenly turned and sat on the steps and with his hands held up pleaded for mercy, his pleas however, were answered with a fusillade of gunfire.

External audio
- Newsreel scenes in Spanish of the Puerto Rican Nationalist Party Revolts of the 1950s here

Hernández, who was also severely wounded, continued firing at the police from under his car. A police officer and a detective from La Fortaleza with submachine guns approached the car and fired upon Hernández, Carlos Hiraldo Resto and Torres Medina. Both Carlos Hiraldo Resto and Torres Medina were killed, and their motionless bodies were by the right side of the car.

Hernández was believed to be dead, however he wasn't, and he was taken to the local hospital along with the wounded police officers where they were operated on for their respective wounds. The battle lasted 15 minutes and at the end of the battle there were five nationalist casualties (four dead and one wounded) plus three wounded police officers.

E. Rivera Orellana, a sixth "Nationalist" who later turned out to be an undercover agent, was arrested near La Fortaleza and later released.

=== Arrests and accusations ===
List of some Cadets who were arrested during the Uprising of 1950

Number	Name of Cadet	Cadet company	Incident participation	Accusation
1.	Noé Martí Torres	Cabo Rojo	Mayagüez Incident	Attack to commit murder (he escaped to Cuba)
2.	Eduardo López Vázquez	Cayey	Martin Peña Incident	Sedition
3.	José Antonio Ballet Pérez	Mayagüez	Mayagüez Incident	Attack to commit murder
4.	Carlos Feliciano Vázquez	Mayagüez	Arecibo Incident	Attack to commit murder
5.	Ezequiel Lugo Morales	Mayagüez	Mayagüez Incident	Attack to commit murder
6.	Eladio Sotomayor Cancel	Mayagüez	Mayagüez Incident	Attack to commit murder
7.	Justo Toro Castillo	Mayagüez	Mayagüez Incident	Sedition
8.	Manuel Toro Rivera	Mayagüez	Mayagüez Incident	Sedition
9.	Alejandro Figueroa Rosado	Naranjito	Naranjito Incident	Attack to commit murder
10.	Ramón Luis Serrano	Naranjito	Naranjito Incident	Attack to commit murder
11.	Marcelino Turell Rivera	Ponce	Peñuelas Incident	Attack to commit murder
12.	Diego Quiñones González	San Juan	San Juan Post Office Incident	Attack to commit murder
13.	José Avilés Massanet	Utuado	Utuado Uprising	Attack to commit murder
14.	Ángel Colón Feliciano	Utuado	Utuado Uprising	Attack to commit murder
15.	Eladio Olivero	Utuado	Utuado Uprising	Attack to commit murder

== Aftermath ==
The revolt of October 1950 failed because of the overwhelming force used by the U.S. military, the U.S. National Guard, the FBI, the CIA, and the Puerto Rican Insular Police—all of whom were aligned against the Nationalists. This force was responsible for the machinegunning of Nationalists and Cadets alike and the aerial bombing of the towns of Jayuya and Utuado.

The United States Constitution places final control of territorial affairs with Congress. However, the responses to the uprising appeared to emanate independently from the federal and local authorities. President Harry S. Truman distanced himself entirely from the uprisings and acted as though they had never occurred. In addition, the news of the U.S. military response, which killed dozens of Puerto Ricans and wounded hundreds more, was prevented from spreading outside of Puerto Rico. Instead, it was called an "incident between Puerto Ricans."

Hundreds of Cadets and Nationalists were arrested by mid-November 1950 and the party was never the same. The Cadets of the Republic ceased to function as an officially organized military organ of the Puerto Rican Nationalist Party.

According to the FBI Files - Puerto Rico Nationalist Party (SJ 100-3, Vol. 23), Aguedo Ramos Medina (who once served as Commander of Instruction for the Cadets) and Faustino Díaz Pacheco (the brother of Cadet Commander Ramón Díaz Pacheco) both "cooperated" with the FBI and provided them vital and ongoing intelligence about the Cadets for a period of several years.

Both of these men—Ramos Medina and Díaz Pacheco—provided the FBI with copious and detailed information about the membership, structure, funding, and activities of the Cadets of the Republic. In providing the FBI this information, both men betrayed the Nationalist movement. Díaz Pacheco, of course, betrayed his own brother.

Among the factors which have affected the independence movement in Puerto Rico have been the Cointelpro program and the Carpetas program. The Cointelpro program was a project conducted by the United States Federal Bureau of Investigation (FBI) aimed at surveying, infiltrating, discrediting, and disrupting domestic political organizations. The Carpetas program was a massive collection of information gathered by the island's police on so-called "political subversives". The police had in its possession thousands of extensive carpetas (files) concerning individuals of all social groups and ages. Approximately 75,000 persons were listed as under political police surveillance. The massive surveillance apparatus was aimed primarily against Puerto Rico's independence movement. Thus, many independence supporters moved to the Popular Democratic Party as a means to an end to stop statehood.

== See also ==
- List of Puerto Ricans
- List of revolutions and rebellions

19th Century male leaders of the Puerto Rican Independence Movement

- Ramón Emeterio Betances
- Mathias Brugman
- Francisco Ramírez Medina
- Manuel Rojas
- Segundo Ruiz Belvis
- Antonio Valero de Bernabé

19th Century female leaders of the Puerto Rican Independence Movement

- María de las Mercedes Barbudo
- Lola Rodríguez de Tió
- Mariana Bracetti

Male members of the Puerto Rican Nationalist Party

- Pedro Albizu Campos
- José S. Alegría
- Casimiro Berenguer
- Rafael Cancel Miranda
- José Coll y Cuchí
- Oscar Collazo
- Juan Antonio Corretjer
- Carmelo Delgado Delgado
- Raimundo Díaz Pacheco
- Hugo Margenat
- Francisco Matos Paoli
- Vidal Santiago Díaz
- Daniel Santos
- Clemente Soto Vélez
- Griselio Torresola
- Antonio Vélez Alvarado
- Carlos Vélez Rieckehoff
- Teófilo Villavicencio Marxuach

Female members of the Puerto Rican Nationalist Party

- Julia de Burgos
- Blanca Canales
- Rosa Collazo
- Lolita Lebrón
- Isabel Rosado
- Isabel Freire de Matos
- Ruth Mary Reynolds
- Isolina Rondón
- Olga Viscal Garriga

Articles related to the Puerto Rican Independence Movement

- Puerto Rican Nationalist Party
- Ponce massacre
- Río Piedras massacre
- Puerto Rican Nationalist Party Revolts of the 1950s
- Puerto Rican Independence Party
- Grito de Lares
- Intentona de Yauco
