= Elías Beauchamp =

Puerto Rican independence advocate

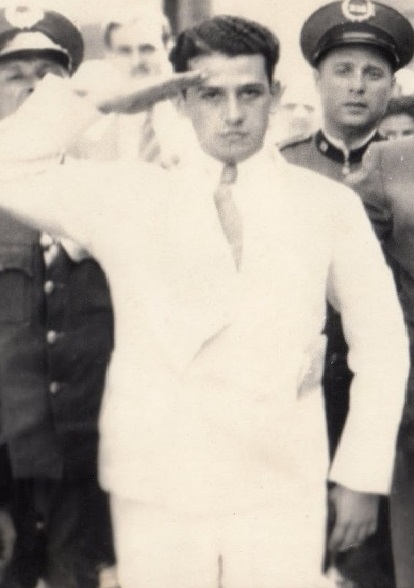
- Elías Beauchamp
- Born: June 8, 1908; Utuado, Puerto Rico
- Died: February 23, 1936 (aged 27); San Juan, Puerto Rico
- Cause of death: Extrajudicial killing
- Political party: Puerto Rican Nationalist Party
- Movement: Puerto Rican Independence
- Spouse: Ana Luisa Pérez

Elías Beauchamp (June 8, 1908 – February 23, 1936) was a member of the Cadets of the Republic, the paramilitary wing of the Puerto Rican Nationalist Party. Beauchamp is best known for having assassinated Col. Elisha Francis Riggs, the United States appointed chief of the Puerto Rico Police, along with fellow Cadet Hiram Rosado. Both men were arrested and shot without trial at Police Headquarters in San Juan. News of the assassinations spread throughout the United States and led to legislative proposal by U.S. Senator Millard Tydings, to grant independence to Puerto Rico.

== Early years ==
Beauchamp (birth name: Elías Beauchamp Beauchamp) was born in the town of Utuado, Puerto Rico to Juan Francisco Beauchamp Brugman, the grandson of Mathias Brugman, and Julia Beauchamp Bello. There he received his primary and secondary education. After he graduated from high school, he went to work for Leopoldo Santiago Carmona, who was the fiscal of the district of Guayama. In 1913, Santiago Carmona was appointed the fiscal of the district of Humacao.

Beauchamp moved to the City of Bayamon and worked for a tobacco company owned and operated by the American Tobacco Company. The American Tobacco Company had gained control of most of the island's tobacco fields after the Spanish–American War. He met and married Ana Luisa Perez and moved to San Juan where he was employed by J. Ramirez & Sons, an import and export company. He lived with his wife and two children in the Calle Luna.

== Puerto Rican Nationalist Party ==
The Puerto Rican Nationalist Party was founded by José Coll y Cuchí as a direct response to the American colonial government in 1919, By the 1920s, there were two other pro-independence organizations in the Island, they were the "Nationalist Youth" and the "Independence Association of Puerto Rico". On September 17, 1922, the two political organizations merged into the Puerto Rican Nationalist Party. In 1924, Dr. Pedro Albizu Campos joined the party and on May 11, 1930, Dr. Pedro Albizu Campos was elected president of the Puerto Rican Nationalist Party.

Beauchamp became interested in the cause for Puerto Rican independence and joined the Nationalist Party. He was a member of the Cadets of the Republic (Cadetes de la Republica). The cadets was a quasi-military youth organization of the Nationalist Party also known as the "Liberation Army of Puerto Rico". There he met and befriended fellow cadet Hiram Rosado.

== Events leading to a massacre ==
In 1931, the U.S.-appointed Governor of Puerto Rico, Theodore Roosevelt Jr. named Dr. Carlos E. Chardón as Chancellor of the University of Puerto Rico. In 1935, Chardón initiated a project based on the ideas of Luis Muñoz Marín, who at the time was a Senator in the Puerto Rican legislature and member of the Liberal Party of Puerto Rico. It was known as the Reconstruction of Puerto Rico Project. The plan, which was within the New Deal criteria established by U.S. President Franklin Delano Roosevelt during the Great Depression, was well received and became known as Plan Chardón.

On October 20, 1935, in a political meeting which the Nationalist Party held in the town of Maunabo and which was transmitted by radio, Albizu Campos denounced Chardón, the university deans and the Liberal Party as traitors, saying they wanted to convert the university into an "American" propaganda institution. On October 23, 1935, a group of students at the university who supported Chardón began to collect signatures for a petition to declare Albizu Campos "Student Enemy Number One." In turn, a protest against the group by the pro-Nationalist faction of students denounced Chardón and the Liberal Party as agents of the United States.

== The Río Piedras massacre ==
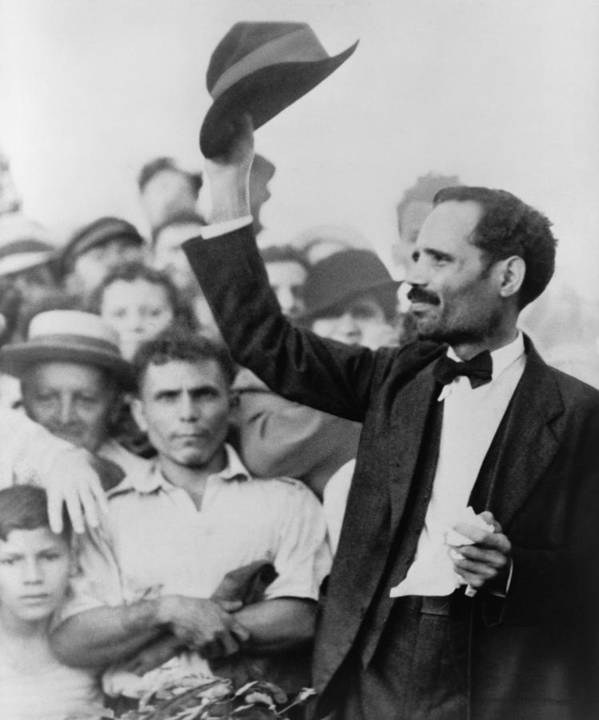
Don Pedro Albizu Campos in 1936

On October 24, 1935, a student assembly held at the university declared Albizu Campos as persona non grata. Chardón requested that the governor provide armed police officers on the university grounds, in case the situation turned violent. Two police officers spotted a "suspicious-looking vehicle" and asked the driver, Ramón S. Pagán, and his friend Pedro Quiñones, for identification. A struggle ensued, and the police killed Pagán and Quiñones. According to the local newspaper "El Mundo" of Oct. 25th, an explosion, followed by gunfire, was heard resulting in the additional deaths of Eduardo Rodríguez Vega and José Santiago Barea. At the time Elisha Francis Riggs was the United States appointed police chief of Puerto Rico.

An eyewitness, Isolina Rondón, testified that she saw the police officers shooting at the victims and heard one police officer screaming "not to let them escape alive." Her testimony was ignored, and no charges were filed against the police officers. The Río Piedras massacre left four men dead.

== The assassination of Elisha F. Riggs ==
Colonel Elisha Francis Riggs was born in Georgetown, a historic neighborhood located in northwest Washington, D.C. Riggs was a former officer in the United States Army who was appointed Chief of Police of Puerto Rico in 1933, by Blanton Winship, the U.S. appointed governor of Puerto Rico. He was an unpopular police chief, stemming from his decisions to repress the growing sugar cane labor movement and the Nationalist Pro-Independence Movement.

The Río Piedras Massacre enraged the nationalists. Beauchamp and the nationalists believed that Elisha Francis Riggs was responsible since Riggs was the police chief of Puerto Rico and the entire Insular Police took their orders from Riggs. He decided to retaliate and avenge the deaths of the four men killed in the massacre with the help of Rosado.

On Sunday, February 23, 1936, Elisha F. Riggs had attended mass in the Church of Santa Ana in San Juan. When the mass was over, Riggs stepped out of the church and got into his car, a Packard, driven by Angel Alvarez, a police officer. Rosado knew the route which Riggs would normally take and waited. When Riggs' car reached the corner of Allen and Gambaro streets, Rosado came out of his hideout and began shooting towards Riggs. Rosado then made a run for it, but was soon captured by Alvarez. All the while, Riggs got out of his car and began asking for the declarations of those who witnessed the attempt on his life. He was suddenly approached by Beauchamp who said:

"I saw everything, Colonel, I saw everything"

Believing that he had a witness to the events Riggs told Beauchamp that he was headed to the police station and to accompany him. Beauchamp boarded Riggs chauffeured car and shot Riggs in the head killing him instantly. Beauchamp tried to escape by hiding inside the nearby Rodriguez y Palacios warehouse in Tetuan Street.

Beauchamp and Rosado were arrested and Beauchamp was photographed by the local news media giving a cadet military salute before he and Rosado were taken to the San Juan police headquarters. The police station was located in 305 San Francisco Street.

Instead of receiving a fair trial, Beauchamp and Rosado were both gunned down by the police in the police station. Beauchamp died immediately and Rosado was transferred to a local hospital where he later died of the gun wounds which he received. In the aftermath of the killings, the police claimed that the nationalists were shot because they attempted to escape. None of the police officers involved were demoted or suspended.

The news of the assassination of Elisha F. Riggs spread throughout the United States. At that time Puerto Rican Senator, Luis Muñoz Marín, was in Washington, D.C., and Ernest Gruening, the administrator of the Puerto Rico Reconstruction Administration (1935–1937), asked him to condemn Riggs' assassination. Muñoz Marín told Gruening that he would do so only if he was also allowed to condemn the police for murdering the Nationalists in the city police station without a trial. Gruening then joined US Senator Millard Tydings a Democrat from Maryland, in a legislative proposal to grant independence to Puerto Rico. However, the bill did not progress in Congress.

== Post assassination ==
Six police officers were indicted for first degree murder for the summary executions. However, they were all acquitted.

After Riggs' assassination, many Nationalist Party leaders were imprisoned. Members of the Puerto Rican independence movement came under greater scrutiny and persecution. Among the leaders arrested was Pedro Albizu Campos, These leaders were charged with having "conspired to overthrow" the U.S. government on the island. They were tried in Boston, Massachusetts, as that federal district court had jurisdiction for Puerto Rico. The first trial jury ended in a hung jury. A second jury was picked, consisting solely of "Anglo-Americans." This jury found every Nationalist charged to be "guilty".

== See also ==
- List of Puerto Ricans
- Boricua Popular Army
- Fuerzas Armadas de Liberación Nacional (Puerto Rico)
- French immigration to Puerto Rico
