= Hiram Rosado =

Puerto Rican militant (1911–1936)

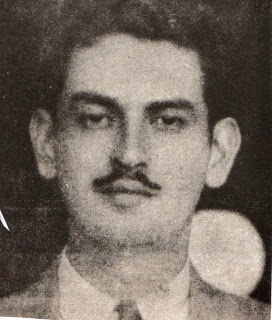
- Hiram Rosado (1936)
- Born: 1911; Ciales, Puerto Rico
- Died: February 23, 1936 (aged 24/25); San Juan, Puerto Rico
- Cause of death: Extrajudicial killing
- Political party: Puerto Rican Nationalist Party
- Movement: Puerto Rican Independence

Hiram Rosado (1911-February 23, 1936) was a member of the Cadets of the Republic, the paramilitary wing of the Puerto Rican Nationalist Party who, together with fellow Cadet Elías Beauchamp, carried out the 1936 assassination of Col. Elisha Francis Riggs, the United States appointed chief of the Puerto Rico Police. Both men were arrested and shot, officially while attempting to escape, at the police headquarters in San Juan. News of the assassinations spread throughout the United States and lead to legislative proposal by U.S. Senator Millard Tydings, to grant independence to Puerto Rico.

== Early years ==
Rosado (birth name: Hiram Rosado Ayala) was born in the town of Ciales, Puerto Rico. There he received his primary and secondary education. Rosado enjoyed reading and his father, Pedro Rosado would often buy him books. Rosado also had a passion for music and played the violin. After he graduated, Rosado went to work for a company called FERA where he became a supervisor.

== Puerto Rican Nationalist Party ==
The Puerto Rican Nationalist Party was founded by José Coll y Cuchí as a direct response to the American colonial government in 1919, By the 1920s, there were two other pro-independence organizations in the Island, they were the "Nationalist Youth" and the "Independence Association of Puerto Rico". On September 17, 1922, the two political organizations merged into the Puerto Rican Nationalist Party. In 1924, Dr. Pedro Albizu Campos joined the party and on May 11, 1930, Dr. Pedro Albizu Campos was elected president of the Puerto Rican Nationalist Party.

Rosado was interested in the cause for Puerto Rican independence and joined the Nationalist Party. He became a member of the Cadets of the Republic (Cadetes de la Republica) where he befriended fellow cadet Elías Beauchamp. The cadets was a quasi-military youth organization of the Nationalist Party also known as the "Liberation Army of Puerto Rico".

== Events leading to a massacre ==
In 1931, the U.S.-appointed Governor of Puerto Rico, Theodore Roosevelt Jr. named Dr. Carlos E. Chardón as Chancellor of the University of Puerto Rico. In 1935, Chardón initiated a project based on the ideas of Luis Muñoz Marín, who at the time was a Senator in the Puerto Rican legislature and member of the Liberal Party of Puerto Rico. It was known as the Reconstruction of Puerto Rico Project. The plan, which was within the New Deal criteria established by U.S. President Franklin Delano Roosevelt during the Great Depression, was well received and became known as Plan Chardón.

On October 20, 1935, in a political meeting which the Nationalist Party held in the town of Maunabo and which was transmitted by radio, Albizu Campos denounced Chardón, the university deans and the Liberal Party as traitors, saying they wanted to convert the university into an "American" propaganda institution.

On October 23, 1935, a group of students at the university who supported Chardón began to collect signatures for a petition to declare Albizu Campos "Student Enemy Number One." In turn, a protest against the group by the pro-Nationalist faction of students denounced Chardón and the Liberal Party as agents of the United States.

== The Río Piedras massacre ==
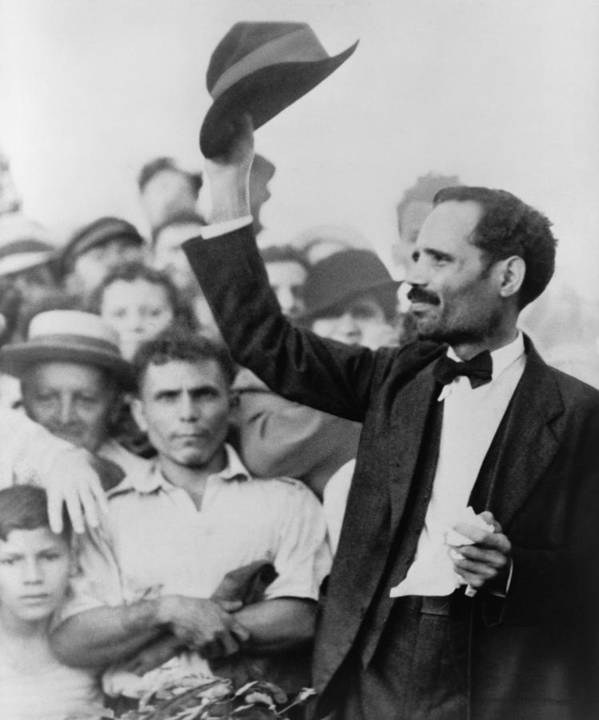
Don Pedro Albizu Campos in 1936

On October 24, 1935, a student assembly held at the university declared Albizu Campos as "persona non grata." Chardón requested that the governor provide armed police officers on the university grounds, in case the situation turned violent. Two police officers spotted a "suspicious-looking vehicle" and asked the driver, Ramón S. Pagán, and his friend Pedro Quiñones, for identification. A struggle ensued, and the police killed Pagán and Quiñones. According to the local newspaper "El Mundo" of Oct. 25th, an explosion, followed by gunfire, was heard resulting in the additional deaths of Eduardo Rodríguez Vega and José Santiago Barea. Elisha Francis Riggs, a former Colonel in the United States Army, was the United States appointed police chief of Puerto Rico.

An eyewitness, Isolina Rondón, testified that she saw the police officers shooting at the victims and heard one police officer screaming "not to let them escape alive." Her testimony was ignored, and no charges were filed against the police officers. The Río Piedras massacre left four men dead.

== Assassination of Elisha F. Riggs ==
Colonel Elisha Francis Riggs was born in Georgetown, a historic neighborhood located in northwest Washington, D.C., Riggs was a former officer in the United States Army who was appointed Chief of the Puerto Rico Police in 1933, by Blanton Winship, the U.S. appointed governor of Puerto Rico. He was an unpopular police chief, stemming from his decisions to repress the growing sugar cane worker's organized labor movement and the Nationalist Pro-Independence Movement.

The Río Piedras Massacre enraged the nationalists including Rosado and Beauchamps. The nationalists believed that Col. Elisha F. Riggs was responsible for the massacre, as the chief of the Puerto Rico Police. Beauchamps decided to retaliate with the help of Rosado.

On Sunday, February 23, 1936, Elisha F. Riggs had attended mass in the Church of Santa Ana in San Juan. When the mass was over, Riggs stepped out of the church and got into his car, a Packard, driven by Angel Alvarez, a police officer. Rosado knew the route which Riggs would normally take and waited. When Riggs' car reached the corner of Allen and Gambaro Streets, Rosado came out of his hideout and began shooting towards Riggs. Rosado then made a run for it, but was soon captured by Alvarez. All the while, Riggs got out of his car and began asking for the declarations of those who witnessed the attempt on his life. He was suddenly approached by Beauchamps who said "I saw everything, Colonel, I saw everything".

Believing that he had a witness to the events Riggs told Beauchamps that he was headed to the police station and to accompany him. Beauchamps boarded Riggs chauffeured car and shot Riggs in the head killing him instantly. Beauchamp tried to escape and hid inside "Rodriguez y Palacios", a warehouse in Tetuan Street. Both men were arrested and taken to the San Juan police headquarters located in 305 San Francisco Street.

They were not given a fair trial, instead Beauchamps and Rosado were both gunned down in the police station. Beauchamps died immediately and Rosado was transferred to a local hospital. In the hospital his last words to a nurse were "How many bullets do I have? My chest hurts a little." He later died of the gun wounds which he received. In the aftermath of the killings, the police claimed that the nationalists were shot because they attempted to escape. None of the police officers involved were demoted or suspended.

The news of the assassination of Elisha F. Riggs spread throughout the United States. At that time Puerto Rican Senator, Luis Muñoz Marín, was in Washington, D.C., and Ernest Gruening, the administrator of the Puerto Rico Reconstruction Administration (1935–1937), asked him to condemn Riggs' assassination. Muñoz Marín told Gruening that he would do so only if he was also allowed to condemn the police for murdering the Nationalists in the city police station without a trial.

== Post assassination ==
Six police officers were indicted for first degree murder for the summary executions. However, they were all acquitted.

After Riggs' assassination, many Nationalist Party leaders were imprisoned. Members of the Puerto Rican independence movement came under greater scrutiny and persecution. Among the leaders arrested was Pedro Albizu Campos, These leaders were charged with having "conspired to overthrow" the U.S. government on the island. They were tried in Boston, Massachusetts, as that federal district court had jurisdiction for Puerto Rico. The first trial jury refused to convict, and ended in a hung jury. A second jury was picked, consisting solely of "Anglo-Americans." This jury found every Nationalist charged to be "guilty".

== See also ==
- List of Puerto Ricans
- Boricua Popular Army
- Fuerzas Armadas de Liberación Nacional (Puerto Rico)
