= Blanca Canales =

Puerto Rican politician and independence advocate

- Leader of the Jayuya Uprising
- Born: February 17, 1906; Jayuya, Puerto Rico
- Died: July 25, 1996 (aged 90); Jayuya, Puerto Rico
- Political party: Puerto Rican Nationalist Party
- Movement: Puerto Rican Independence

Blanca Canales (Spanish pronunciation: [ˈblaŋka kaˈnales]; February 17, 1906 – July 25, 1996) was an educator and a Puerto Rican Nationalist. Canales joined the Puerto Rican Nationalist Party in 1931 and helped organize the Daughters of Freedom, the women's branch of the Puerto Rican Nationalist Party.

As a leader of the Nationalist party in Jayuya, she stored arms in her house, which were used in a revolt in 1950 against United States rule over the island. During the Puerto Rican Nationalist Party Revolts of the 1950s she led members in the Jayuya Uprising, in which Nationalists took control of the town for three days.

== Early years ==
Canales was born in Jayuya, Puerto Rico, as Blanca Canales Torresola. She was the younger sister of writer and politician Nemesio Canales. Her family was politically active and her father was part of the "Partido Unión de Puerto Rico" (Union Party of Puerto Rico). It lobbied for the independence of the island. Her mother was a strong-willed woman who encouraged her children to think for themselves.

As a child, Canales read many books and stories about other nations and their heroes. She often accompanied her father to political meetings, where she enjoyed the speeches, flag-waving, and patriotic fervor. Canales finished her primary and secondary education in Jayuya.

In 1924, her father died and her mother moved to Ponce. Canales graduated from Ponce High School and, in May 1930, earned her bachelor's degree from the University of Puerto Rico. Before graduating, she attended a conference given by the President of the Puerto Rican Nationalist Party, Pedro Albizu Campos, and was impressed by the ideals of independence which he preached. Canales returned to the university that same year, and took a course of study in social work.

== Nationalist Party ==
Canales returned to Jayuya and worked at a local rural school. In 1931, she joined the Nationalist Party and was active in organizing the Daughters of Freedom, the women's branch of the Puerto Rican Nationalist Party. During the 1940s, Canales' active political participation was limited to making monetary collections because her job kept her constantly traveling from San Juan to Ponce.

After Canales joined the party, a series of increasingly hostile events between the U.S.-appointed government and the Nationalists took place in the 1930s. In 1936, Albizu Campos was arrested and on March 31, 1937 the infamous Ponce massacre took place. In 1947, Albizu Campos was released from jail.

== Puerto Rican Gag Law ==
On May 21, 1948, a bill was introduced before the Puerto Rican Senate which would restrain the rights of the independence and Nationalist movements on the archipelago. The Senate, which at the time was controlled by the Partido Popular Democrático (PPD) and presided by Luis Muñoz Marín, approved the bill that day. This bill, which resembled the anti-communist Smith Act passed in the United States in 1940, became known as the Ley de la Mordaza (Gag Law, technically "Law 53 of 1948") when the U.S.-appointed governor of Puerto Rico, Jesús T. Piñero, signed it into law on June 10, 1948.

Under this new law it became a crime to print, publish, sell, or exhibit any material intended to paralyze or destroy the insular government; or to organize any society, group or assembly of people with a similar destructive intent. It made it illegal to sing a patriotic song, and reinforced the 1898 law that had made it illegal to display the Flag of Puerto Rico, with anyone found guilty of disobeying the law in any way being subject to a sentence of up to ten years imprisonment, a fine of up to US$10,000 (equivalent to $134,000 in 2025), or both.

According to Leopoldo Figueroa, member of the Partido Estadista Puertorriqueño (Puerto Rican Statehood Party) and the only member of the Puerto Rico House of Representatives who did not belong to the PPD, the law was repressive and in violation of the First Amendment of the US Constitution which guarantees Freedom of Speech.

On June 21, 1948, Albizu Campos gave a speech in the town of Manati, which explained how this Gag Law violated the First Amendment of the U.S. Constitution. Nationalists from all over the island attended – to hear Campos's speech, and to prevent the police from arresting him.

== Police repression ==
On October 26, 1950, Albizu Campos held a political meeting in Fajardo. After the meeting Albizu Campos received word that he was going to be arrested and that his house in San Juan was surrounded by the police. He escaped from Fajardo and ordered the revolution to start. On October 27, the police in the town of Peñuelas, intercepted and fired upon a caravan of nationalists, killing four. On October 30, the nationalists were ordered to stage uprisings in the towns of Ponce, Mayagüez, Naranjito, Arecibo, Utuado, San Juan and Jayuya.

External audio
- Newsreel scenes on YouTube in Spanish of the Puerto Rican Nationalist Party Revolts of the 1950s

The first battle of the Nationalist uprisings occurred in the pre-dawn hours of October 29, in the barrio Macaná in the town of Peñuelas. The police surrounded the house of the mother of Melitón Muñiz the president of the Peñuelas Nationalist Party, under the pretext that he was storing weapons for the Nationalist Revolt. Without warning, the police fired upon the nationalists and a firefight between both factions ensued, which resulted with the death of two nationalists and six police officers wounded.

== Jayuya uprising ==
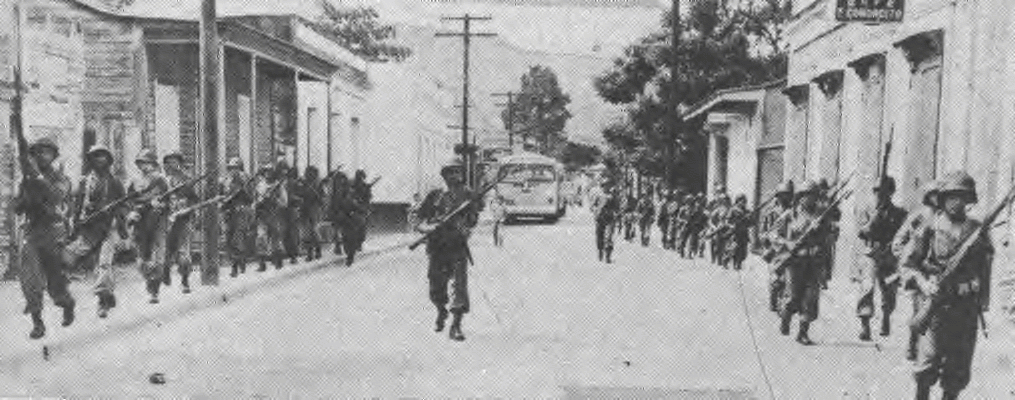
The National Guard, commanded by the Puerto Rico Adjutant General Major General Luis R. Esteves and under the orders of Gov. Luis Muñoz Marín, occupy Jayuya

On October 30, 1950, the Nationalist leaders in Jayuya – including Canales, her cousin Elio Torresola (Griselio Torresola's brother) and Carlos Irizarry – entered the town of Jayuya with a group of nationalists in a bus and a car. Canales led the group to her house in Barrio Coabey, a neighborhood of Jayuya, where she had been stockpiling arms and ammunition.

Armed with the weapons she had stored, Canales and the men attacked and occupied the police station. The Nationalists then occupied the post office, approached the telephone station, and cut the phone lines. Canales led the group to the town plaza, raised the Puerto Rican Flag (which was outlawed at the time), and declared Puerto Rico a Free Republic.

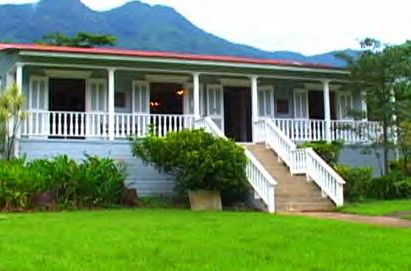
Casa Museo Blanca Canales

After being notified that Carlos Irizarry was wounded, Canales hurried to the town hospital but the police had shut down the hospital, and she found Irizarry leaning against a lamp post. He had been wounded in a gunfight at the police station. Canales rushed him to a hospital in Utuado, the neighboring town.

Jayuya was under Nationalist control for three days until it was attacked by U.S military planes, artillery, mortar fire, grenades, U.S. infantry troops, and the Puerto Rican National Guard commanded by the Puerto Rico Adjutant General Major General Luis R. Estéves, which occupied the town. The Nationalists surrendered on November 1, 1950.

Canales was arrested and accused of killing a police officer, wounding three others, and burning down the post office. Following a brief federal trial, she was sentenced to life imprisonment plus sixty years. In June 1951, she was sent to the Alderson Federal Prison Camp in Alderson, West Virginia. In prison she developed a close friendship with fellow nationalist Lolita Lebrón, who led the 1954 Nationalist attack on the US House of Representatives, and Rosa Collazo, the wife of Oscar Collazo and treasurer of the New York City branch of the Puerto Rican Nationalist Party.

== Later years ==
In 1956, Canales was transferred to the Women's Jail in Vega Alta, Puerto Rico. In 1967, after 17 years in prison, Canales was given a full pardon by Puerto Rican Governor Roberto Sanchez Vilella. She continued to be an active independence advocate until the day she died.

Canales died in 1996 in her hometown of Jayuya. She is buried in the "Cementerio Municipal" (Municipal Cemetery) in her hometown Jayuya.

== Legacy ==
The house in which Blanca and Nemesio Canales were born and raised was turned into a museum by the City of Jayuya.

A plaque was placed at the monument to the Jayuya Uprising participants in Mayagüez, Puerto Rico, honoring the women of the Puerto Rican Nationalist Party. Canales' name is on the second line of the third plate.

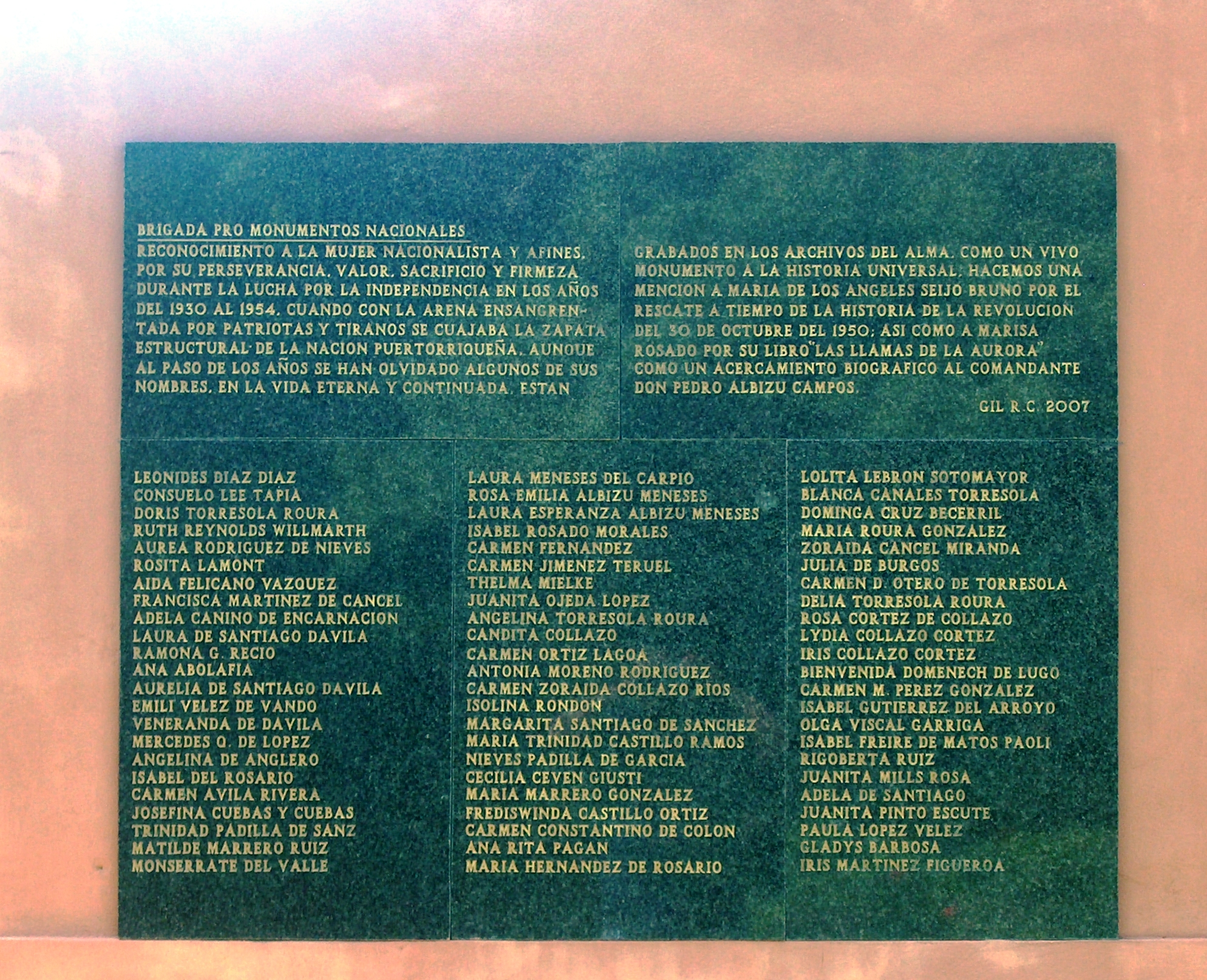
Plaque honoring the women of the Puerto Rican Nationalist Party

== See also ==
- List of Puerto Ricans
- History of women in Puerto Rico

19th Century female leaders of the Puerto Rican Independence Movement

- María de las Mercedes Barbudo
- Lola Rodríguez de Tió
- Mariana Bracetti

Female members of the Puerto Rican Nationalist Party

- Julia de Burgos
- Rosa Collazo
- Lolita Lebrón
- Ruth Mary Reynolds
- Isabel Rosado
- Isabel Freire de Matos
- Isolina Rondón
- Olga Viscal Garriga

Articles related to the Puerto Rican Independence Movement

- Puerto Rican Nationalist Party Revolts of the 1950s
- Puerto Rican Nationalist Party
- Ponce massacre
- Río Piedras massacre
- Cadets of the Republic
- Puerto Rican Independence Party
- Grito de Lares
- Intentona de Yauco
