= Carmelo Delgado Delgado =

Puerto Rican activist

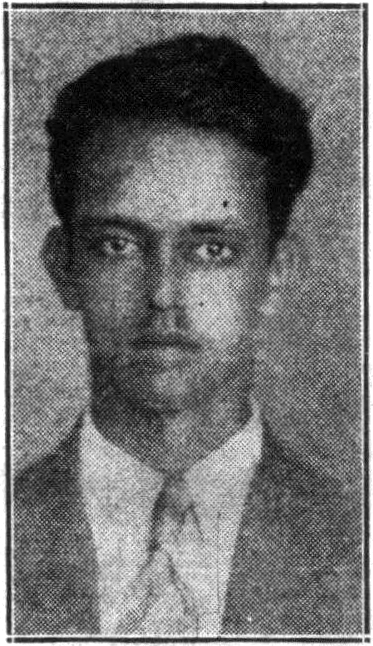
- Born: April 20, 1913; Guayama, Puerto Rico
- Died: April 29, 1937 (aged 24) vicinity of Valladolid, Spain
- Cause of death: Execution by firing squad
- Military career
- Allegiance: Puerto Rico / Spanish Second Republic
- Branch: Abraham Lincoln International Brigade
- Service years: Spain: 1936–1937 / Puerto Rico Nationalist Party liberation armed forces: 1932-
- Rank: Lieutenant
- Conflicts: Spanish Civil War; *Battle of Madrid
- Awards: Spanish Civil War Medal of the International Brigades

Carmelo Delgado Delgado (April 20, 1913 – April 29, 1937) was a leader of the Puerto Rican Nationalist Party. Delgado joined the Abraham Lincoln International Brigade and fought against the Spanish Nationalists in the Spanish Civil War. Delgado Delgado, a Puerto Rican by birth and national origin, is thought to be the first Puerto Rican to die in Spain's civil war.

== Early years ==
Delgado was one of three siblings born to Eladio Delgado Berrios and Flora Delgado Gonzalez in the town of Guayama, Puerto Rico. He spent his early childhood on his parents' farm located in Guamani barrio and later moved with his family to the Calle (Street) Concordia esquina (Corner) Hostos in the town of Guayama. There he received his primary and secondary education.

== Puerto Rican Nationalist ==
Delgado enrolled and was accepted in the University of Puerto Rico, where he befriended Puerto Rican poet and Nationalist Juan Antonio Corretjer. Delgado became a pro-independence political activist and follower of Dr. Pedro Albizu Campos. He was a member of the Cadets of the Republic (Cadetes de la República), the youth organization of the Puerto Rican Nationalist Party. After earning his bachelor's degree, he moved to Spain in pursuit of a law degree.

== Spanish Civil War ==
On September 22, 1935, Delgado left for Spain and upon his arrival enrolled in the Central University of Madrid. He arrived in a Spain which was about to be confronted with a civil war between the loyalists and rebels. Delgado became politically active as a supporter of the Spanish Second Republic and upon the outbreak of the Spanish Civil War, joined the Abraham Lincoln International Brigade. The Abraham Lincoln Brigade was made up mostly of volunteers from the United States, which included Puerto Ricans and Cubans who served in the Spanish Civil War in the International Brigades. Delgado wrote to his friend, Puerto Rican Nationalist leader Carlos Carrera Benítez, the following letter:

"Everyday I have more faith in our country (Puerto Rico) and I see the day coming when our people, like the people of Spain will take arms to squash the tyrants (the United States) with the same valor and resolution that the people of Spain have taken against their military and political traitors." "How I wish that you were in Spain!. I know that you would not stand with your arms crossed and that together we would write a page that would be considered an honor in our land and a motive of pride for the land of our grandfathers" "No one in Puerto Rico should know that I have joined the revolution"

Delgado was involved in the Battle of Madrid, when he became unaware that his troops were ordered to retreat. He was captured and sent to Valladolid, where he faced a military war tribune. The United States Embassy offered to help, however Delgado refused their offer. According to Corretjer: "Carmelo Delgado preferred to die before a firing squad than to beg for his life to the "Yankee".

== Aftermath ==
Carmelo Delgado Delgado was executed on April 29, 1937 by firing squad, becoming one of the first Puerto Ricans that died in that conflict. The news of his execution reached Puerto Rico and was posted on the front page of El Mundo newspaper on July 25, 1937, as "Se confirma la ejecución del joven Carmelo Delgado" (The execution of Carmelo Delgado, a young man, has been confirmed).

== Military decoration ==
Carmelo Delgado Delgado was awarded the following:

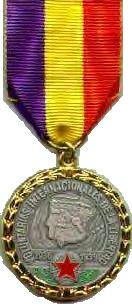
- Spanish Civil War Medal of the International Brigades

== See also ==
- List of Puerto Ricans
- List of Puerto Rican military personnel
- Puerto Rican Nationalist Party
- Cadets of the Republic
