= San Juan Nationalist revolt =

Revolt against the United States Government in Puerto Rico

- Part of Puerto Rican Nationalist Party revolts of the 1950s
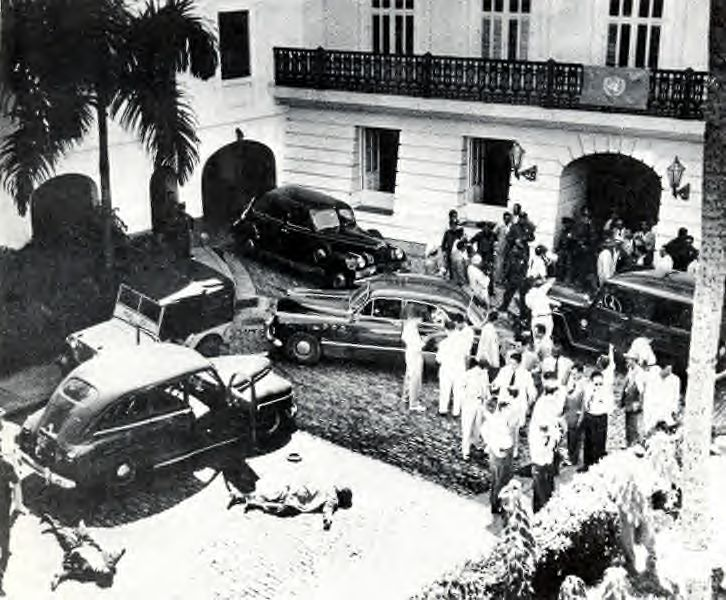
- The bodies of Nationalists Carlos Hiraldo Resto and Manuel Torres Medina lie on the grounds of "La Fortaleza"
Date	October 30, 1950
Location	San Juan, Puerto Rico
Result	United States victory: Uprising suppressed

Belligerents
Puerto Rican Nationalist Party	United States

Commanders and leaders
Blanca Canales	(United States) Luis R. Esteves

Casualties and losses
3 dead, 1 injured	6 police officers injured

The San Juan Nationalist revolt was one of many uprisings against United States Government rule which occurred in Puerto Rico on October 30, 1950 during the Puerto Rican Nationalist Party revolts. Amongst the uprising's main objectives were an attack on La Fortaleza (the governor's mansion in San Juan), and the U.S. Federal Court House Building in Old San Juan.

== Events leading to the revolt ==
On September 17, 1922, the Puerto Rican Nationalist Party was formed. José Coll y Cuchí, a former member of the Union Party, was elected its first president. He wanted radical changes within the economy and social welfare programs of Puerto Rico. In 1924, Pedro Albizu Campos, a lawyer, joined the party and was named its vice president.

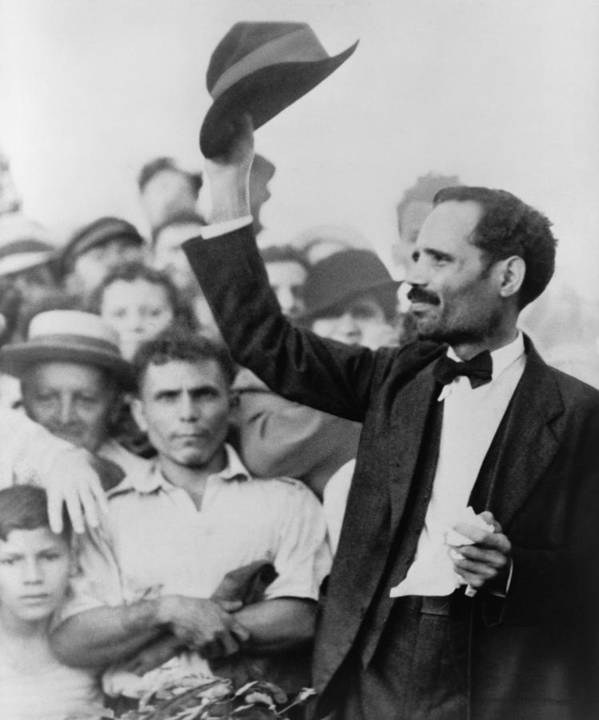
Don Pedro Albizu Campos, leader of the Puerto Rican Nationalist Party

Albizu Campos was the first Puerto Rican graduate of Harvard Law School. He had served as a Second Lieutenant in the U.S. Army during World War I, and believed that Puerto Rico should be an independent nation - even if that required an armed confrontation. By 1930, Coll y Cuchí departed from the party because of his disagreements with Albizu Campos as to how the party should be run. On May 11, 1930, Albizu Campos was elected president of the Nationalist Party.

In the 1930s, the United States-appointed governor of Puerto Rico, Blanton Winship, and police colonel Riggs applied harsh repressive measures against the Nationalist Party. In 1936, Albizu Campos and the leaders of the party were arrested and jailed at the La Princesa prison in San Juan, and later sent to the Federal Prison at Atlanta, Georgia. On March 21, 1937, the Nationalists held a parade in Ponce and the police opened fire on the crowd, in what was to become known as the Ponce massacre. Albizu Campos returned to Puerto Rico on December 15, 1947 after spending 10 years in prison.

On May 21, 1948, a bill was introduced before the Puerto Rican Senate which would restrain the rights of the independence and Nationalist movements on the island. The Senate, controlled by the Partido Popular Democrático (PPD) and presided by Luis Muñoz Marín, approved the bill that day. This bill, which resembled the anti-communist Smith Act passed in the United States in 1940, became known as the Ley de la Mordaza (Gag Law) when the U.S.-appointed governor of Puerto Rico, Jesús T. Piñero, signed it into law on June 10, 1948.

Under this new law it would be a crime to print, publish, sell, or exhibit any material intended to paralyze or destroy the insular government; or to organize any society, group or assembly of people with a similar destructive intent. It made it illegal to sing a patriotic song, and reinforced the 1898 law that had made it illegal to display the Flag of Puerto Rico, with anyone found guilty of disobeying the law in any way being subject to a sentence of up to ten years imprisonment, a fine of up to US$10,000 (equivalent to $134,000 in 2025), or both. According to Dr. Leopoldo Figueroa, member of the Partido Estadista Puertorriqueño (Puerto Rican Statehood Party) and the only member of the Puerto Rico House of Representatives who did not belong to the PPD, the law was repressive and was in violation of the First Amendment of the US Constitution which guarantees Freedom of Speech. He pointed out that the law as such was a violation of the civil rights of the people of Puerto Rico.

On June 21, 1948, Albizu Campos gave a speech in the town of Manatí where Nationalists from all over the island had gathered, in case the police attempted to arrest him.

== The Ponce massacre ==
One particular event in Puerto Rican history had a galvanizing effect on the Puerto Rican Nationalist movement. The Ponce massacre occurred Palm Sunday, March 21, 1937, when a peaceful march in Ponce, Puerto Rico, turned into a bloody police slaughter of unarmed, defenseless Puerto Ricans.

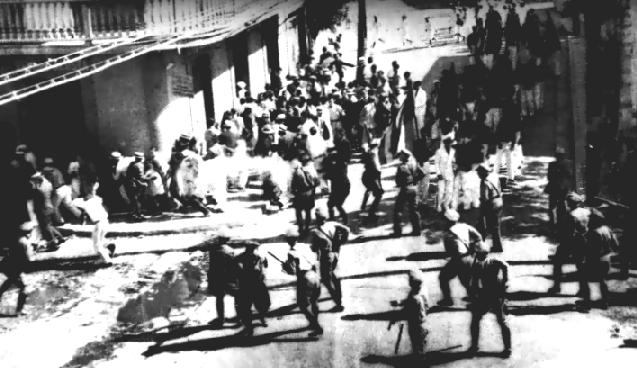
Carlos Torres Morales, a photo journalist for the newspaper El Imparcial was covering the march and took this photograph when the shooting began.

The march had been organized by the Puerto Rican Nationalist Party to commemorate the ending of slavery in Puerto Rico by the governing Spanish National Assembly in 1873. The march was also protesting the imprisonment, by the U.S. government, of Nationalist leader Pedro Albizu Campos on alleged sedition charges.

The bloodshed began when the Insular Police fired on the marchers - killing 18 unarmed civilians, one policeman (shot in friendly fire from his fellow officers), and wounding some 235 civilians, including women and children. One 7-year-old girl was shot (and killed) in the back.

The Insular Police, a force resembling the National Guard, was under the military command of the U.S.-appointed governor of Puerto Rico, General Blanton Winship. Ultimate responsibility fell on Governor Winship, who controlled the National Guard and insular police, and personally ordered the massacre. It was the largest massacre in Puerto Rican history.

== Uprisings ==
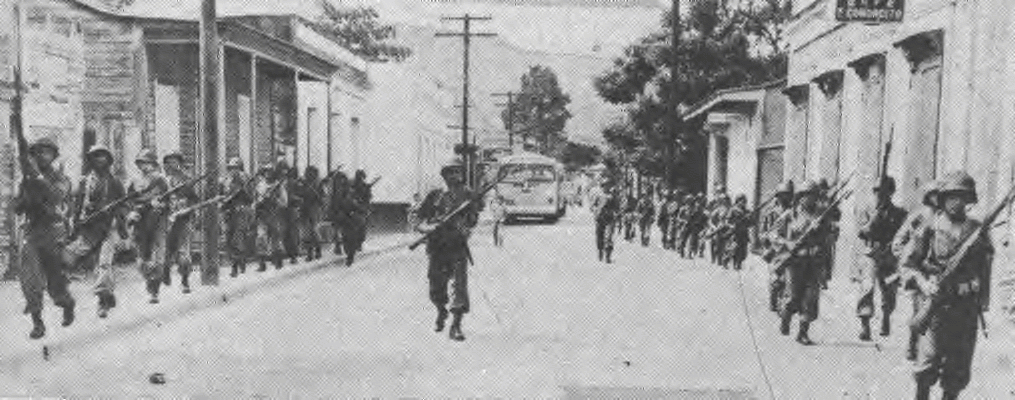
The National Guard, commanded by the Puerto Rico Adjutant General Major General Luis R. Esteves and under the orders of Gov. Luis Muñoz Marín, occupy Jayuya

From 1949 to 1950, the Nationalists in the island began to plan and prepare an armed revolution, hoping that the United Nations would take notice and intervene on their behalf. The uprising was to occur in 1952, on the date the United States Congress was to approve the creation of the political status Free Associated State ("Estado Libre Associado") for Puerto Rico. The reason behind Albizu Campos' call for an armed revolution was that he considered the "new" status a colonial farce.

The police disrupted this timetable, and the Nationalist revolution was accelerated by two years. On October 26, 1950, Albizu Campos was holding a meeting in Fajardo when he received word that his house in San Juan was surrounded by police waiting to arrest him. He was also told that the police had already arrested other Nationalist leaders. He escaped from Fajardo and ordered the revolution to start.

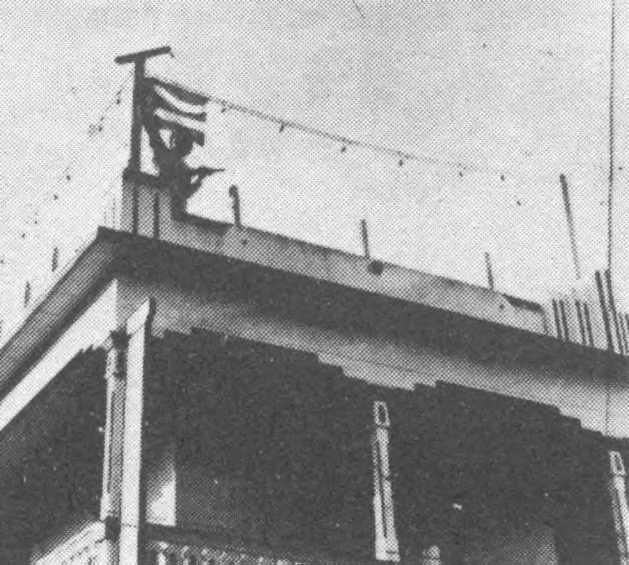
Puerto Rican flag removed by a Puerto Rican National Guard soldier after the 1950 Jayuya Uprising

The next day, on October 27, the police fired upon a caravan of Nationalists in the town of Peñuelas, and killed four of them. This police massacre inflamed many in Puerto Rico, and the outcry was immediate. The first armed battle of the Nationalist uprisings occurred in the early morning of October 29, in the barrio Macaná of town of Peñuelas. The insular police surrounded the house of the mother of Melitón Muñiz Santos, the president of the Peñuelas Nationalist Party in the barrio Macaná, that Muñiz Santos was using as a distribution center for weapons for the Nationalist Revolt. Without warning, the police fired upon the Nationalists in the house and a firefight between both factions ensued, resulting on the death of two Nationalists and wounding of six police officers. Nationalists Meliton Muñoz Santos, Roberto Jaime Rodriguez, Estanislao Lugo Santiago, Marcelino Turell, William Gutirrez and Marcelino Berrios were arrested and accused of participating in an ambush against the local insular police.

The very next day, October 30, saw Nationalist uprisings all over Puerto Rico, including seven towns: Ponce, Mayagüez, Naranjito, Arecibo, Utuado (Utuado Uprising), Jayuya (Jayuya Uprising) and San Juan.

== Attack on the United States Federal Court House ==
In accordance with the planned uprising in San Juan, a group of Nationalists were supposed to attack the mansion known as La Fortaleza, where Puerto Rican governor Luis Muñoz Marín resided. Simultaneously, the Nationalists planned to attack the U.S. Federal Court House, located close to La Marina in Old San Juan.

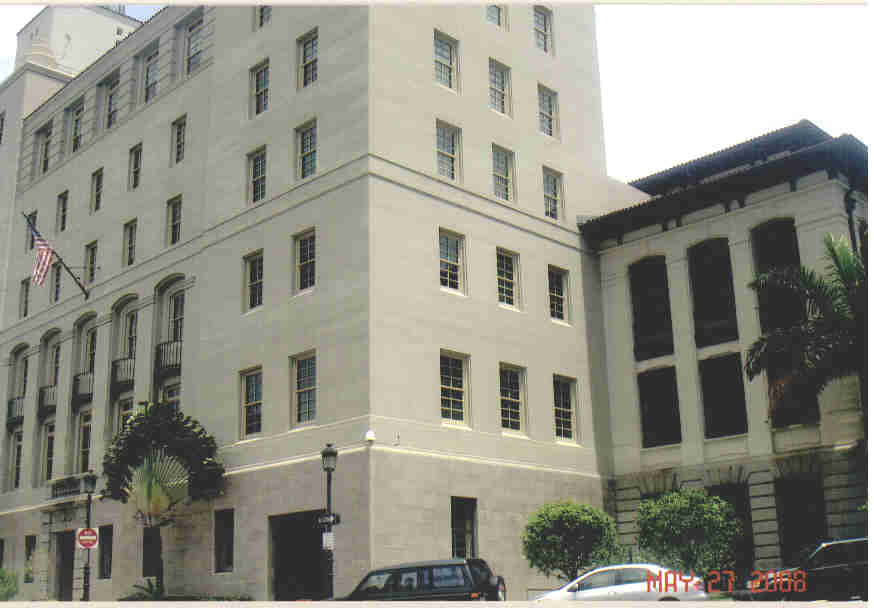
Old Federal Court House in Old San Juan

The government learned of the planned attacks from informants named Faustino Díaz Pacheco and Luciano Cuadra. Faustino Díaz Pacheco was the brother of Raimundo Díaz Pacheco, the Commander-in-Chief of the Nationalist Cadets of the Republic. He was thus aware of all Nationalist activity and planning not only in San Juan, but throughout the entire island. Luciano Cuadra was president of the San Juan chapter of the Nationalist Party. Pacheco and Cuadra betrayed their own organization, informed the police, and later became government witnesses.

Unaware of the internal betrayal, Jesús Pomales González, one of five Nationalists assigned to attack the court house, approached the building and saw the police arresting his comrades Carlos Padilla, Diego Quiñones González, Juan Sandoval Ramos and Joaquín Padín Concepción. Pomales opened fire, the police fired back, and Pomales was taken to the municipal hospital where he would recover from his wounds.

== Attack on La Fortaleza ==
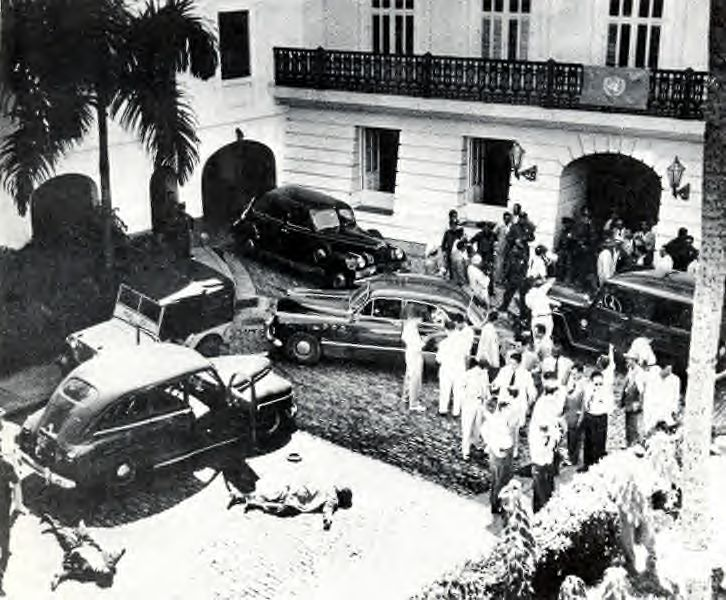
The bodies of Carlos Hiraldo Resto and Manuel Torres Medina lie on the ground, after their attack on La Fortaleza

Earlier that morning, Nationalists Domingo Hiraldo Resto, Carlos Hiraldo Resto, Gregorio Hernández and Manuel Torres Medina who were assigned to attack La Fortaleza, met in the San Juan sector of Martín Peña, at the house of Raimundo Díaz Pacheco - the Nationalist leader and Commander of the Cadets of the Republic. At 11 A.M. they boarded a blue Plymouth and headed towards Old San Juan to accomplish their mission. The men arrived at La Fortaleza at noon and stopped their car 25 feet from their objective's main entrance They got out of the car with a submachine gun and pistols in hand and immediately began firing towards the mansion. Díaz Pacheco headed towards the mansion while the others took cover close to their car and fired with their pistols from their positions.

The Fortaleza guards and police, who already knew of the planned attack, returned fire and a firefight between the two groups ensued. Díaz Pacheco, who was the Leader of the Nationalist Cadets, fired his submachine gun at the second floor of the mansion where the executive offices of Governor Luis Muñoz Marín were located. During the firefight, Díaz Pacheco wounded two police officers, Isidoro Ramos and Vicente Otero Díaz before he was killed by Fortaleza guard Carmelo Dávila.

Meanwhile, the police continued to fire upon the other Nationalists. Domingo Hiraldo Resto was seriously wounded, but despite his wounds he dragged himself towards the mansions entrance. He was able to reach the mansions main door and once there he was motionless and appeared to be dead. He suddenly turned and sat on the steps and with his hands held up pleaded for mercy, his pleas however, were answered with a fusillade of gunfire.

Hernández, who was also severely wounded continued to fire against the police from under the car. A police officer and a detective from La Fortaleza with submachine guns approached the car and fired upon Hernández, Carlos Hiraldo Resto and Torres Medina. Both Carlos Hiraldo Resto and Torres Medina were killed and their motionless bodies laid in the ground by the right side of the car. It was believed that Hernández was dead, however he wasn't and was taken to the local hospital along with the wounded police officers where they were operated for their respective wounds. The battle lasted just over one hour and at the ended of the battle there were five Nationalist casualties, four dead and one wounded, plus three wounded police officers. E. Rivera Orellana, a sixth Nationalist, who later turned out to be an undercover agent, was arrested near La Fortaleza and later released.

== Gun fight at Salón Boricua ==
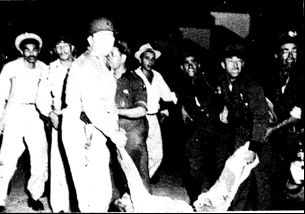
A wounded Vidal Santiago Díaz is carried out of his barbershop by the police

The following day, October 31, at 2:00 p.m., 15 police officers and 25 National Guardsmen arrived at 351 Calle Colton (Colton Street), esquina Barbosa (at the corner of Barbosa Street), of Barrio Obrero (a section named Workers Barrio) in Santurce and surrounded a barbershop named the Salón Boricua. This barbershop was owned and operated by Vidal Santiago Díaz, a Nationalist who was the personal barber of Albizu Campos.

As they surrounded the barbershop, these 40 armed men believed that a large group of Nationalists were inside, and sent a police officer to investigate. Santiago Díaz believed that he was going to be shot by this officer, and armed himself with a pistol. The situation escalated quickly, Santiago Díaz shot first, and the police all fired back - with machine guns, rifles, carbines, revolvers, and even grenades.

The firefight lasted three hours and ended when Santiago Díaz received five bullet wounds, one of them to the head. Two bystanders and a child were also wounded.

This gun battle between 40 heavily armed policemen and one barber, made Puerto Rican radio history. It was the first time an event of this magnitude was transmitted "live" via the radio airwaves, and the entire island was left in shock. The reporters who covered the event for Radio WIAC were Luis Enrique "Bibí" Marrero, Víctor Arrillaga and Luis Romanacce. Miguel Angel Alvarez covered it for Radio WENA. Over a dozen other radio stations were there, as well.

Thinking he was dead, the attacking policemen dragged Santiago Díaz out of his barbershop. When they realized he was still alive, Santiago Díaz was sent to the local municipal hospital. He was hospitalized with fellow Nationalists Gregorio Hernández (who attacked La Fortaleza, the governor's mansion) and Jesús Pomales González (one of five Nationalists assigned to attack the Federal Court House).

== Student March ==
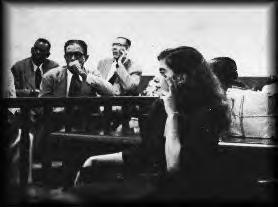
Dr. Olga Viscal Garriga during her trial

Olga Viscal Garriga, a student at the University of Puerto Rico was a student leader and spokesperson of the Puerto Rican Nationalist Party's branch in Rio Piedras.

Though not involved in any violent act, she was arrested, along with nationalists Carmen María Pérez Roque and Ruth Mary Reynolds, in November 2, 1950 for participating in a demonstration that turned deadly in Old San Juan when U.S. forces opened fire, and one of the demonstrators was killed. Viscal Garriga was held without bail in La Princesa prison.

During her trial in federal court, she was uncooperative with the U. S. Government prosecution, and refused to recognize the authority of the U.S. over Puerto Rico. She was sentenced to eight years for contempt of court (not for the initial "charges" regarding the demonstration), and released after serving five years.

== The arrest of Francisco Matos Paoli ==
Francisco Matos Paoli, one of the island's greatest poets, was nominated for the Nobel Prize for literature. He was also named as Secretary General of the Puerto Rican Nationalist Party in 1949. In this position, his responsibilities included the drafting and delivery of patriotic speeches in favor of Puerto Rican independence. In September 1950, Paoli traveled to the towns of Cabo Rojo, Santurce, Guánica and Lares, in order to participate in Nationalist activities.

On November 2, 1950, the police arrived at Francisco Matos Paoli's home in Río Piedras and searched for guns and explosives, however the only thing they found was a Puerto Rican flag.

Paoli was arrested and accused of violating the Ley de la Mordaza (Gag Law). The evidence used against him was the Puerto Rican Flag in his residence, and four speeches he had given in favor of Puerto Rican independence.

Paoli was fired from his professorship at the University of Puerto Rico and sentenced to twenty year's imprisonment, which was later reduced to ten. In jail, he shared his cell with Albizu Campos. Campos suffered from ulceration's on his legs and body allegedly caused by radiation and Paoli tended to his needs.

== The arrest of Pedro Albizu Campos ==
During the revolt, Albizu Campos was at the Nationalist Party's headquarters in Old San Juan which also served as his residence. That day he was accompanied by Juan José Muñoz Matos, Doris Torresola Roura (cousin of Blanca Canales and sister of Griselio Torresola), and Carmen María Pérez Gonzalez.

The occupants of the building were surrounded by the police and the National Guard, who fired their weapons without warning. Doris Torresola, was shot and wounded, and carried out during a cease-fire by Muñoz Matos and Pérez Gonzalez.

Alvaro Rivera Walker, a friend of Albizu Campos, somehow made his way to the Nationalist leader. He stayed with Albizu Campos until the next day, when they were attacked with tear gas. Rivera Walker then raised a white towel attached to a pole, and they surrendered. At that point the National Guard dragged Albizu Campos from his home. He had been rendered unconscious by the tear gas. All the Nationalists, including Albizu Campos, were arrested.

== Incarcerated Nationalists ==
The following is an FBI list of the San Juan Nationalists who were incarcerated in 1950, and were still in prison as of 1954:

- Olga Isabel Viscal Garriga
- Juan Pietri Perez
- Rufino Rolon Marrero
- Oliverio Pierluissi Soto
- Joae Rivera Sotomayor
- Pablo Rosado Ortiz
- Antonio Moya Velez
- Enrique Muniz Medina
- William Rios Figueroa
- Vidal Santiago Díaz

== Aftermath ==
External videos
- To view live-action Newsreel scenes and photos of the Puerto Rican Nationalist Party Revolts of the 1950s (with commentary in Spanish), click here

United States law mandated that U.S. President Harry Truman take direct charge in all matters concerning Puerto Rico. In addition, the Governor of Puerto Rico, Luis Muñoz Marín was required to consult directly with the White House. News of the military action involved however, was prevented from spreading outside of Puerto Rico. It was called an "incident between Puerto Ricans."

Pomales, Hernández and Santiago were hospitalized at the municipal hospital and recovered from their wounds. Pomales was released after six months, accused of three counts of attempted murder, and sentenced to 15 years. Hernández was accused of two counts of attempted murder and sentenced to 15 years. Nationalists Carlos Padilla, Diego Quiñones González, Juan Sandoval Ramos, Joaquín Padín Concepción and Vidal Santiago were also sentenced to various years of prison. After two years, Santiago was eventually pardoned and released.

Paoli was released on January 16, 1952, on probation. During his confinement he suffered from hallucinations which resulted in a mental breakdown and he was sent to a Psychiatric hospital. In 1977, the Department of Hispanic Studies at the University of Puerto Rico campus in Mayagüez nominated him for the Nobel Prize in literature in recognition of his substantial contribution to world literature.

The top leaders of the nationalist party were arrested, including Albizu Campos and the leader of the Jayuya Uprising Blanca Canales, and sent to jail to serve long prison terms. On November 1, 1950, nationalists Griselio Torresola and Oscar Collazo attacked the Blair House with the intention of assassinating U.S. President Truman. Torresola and White House police officer Leslie Coffelt lost their lives in the failed attempt. Collazo was arrested and sentenced to death. His sentence was later commuted to life imprisonment by President Truman, and he eventually received a presidential pardon.

The last major attempt by the Puerto Rican Nationalist Party to draw world attention to Puerto Rico's colonial situation occurred on March 1, 1954, when nationalist leader Lolita Lebrón together with fellow nationalists Rafael Cancel Miranda, Irvin Flores and Andres Figueroa Cordero attacked the United States House of Representatives. Lebrón and her comrades were charged with attempted murder and other crimes.

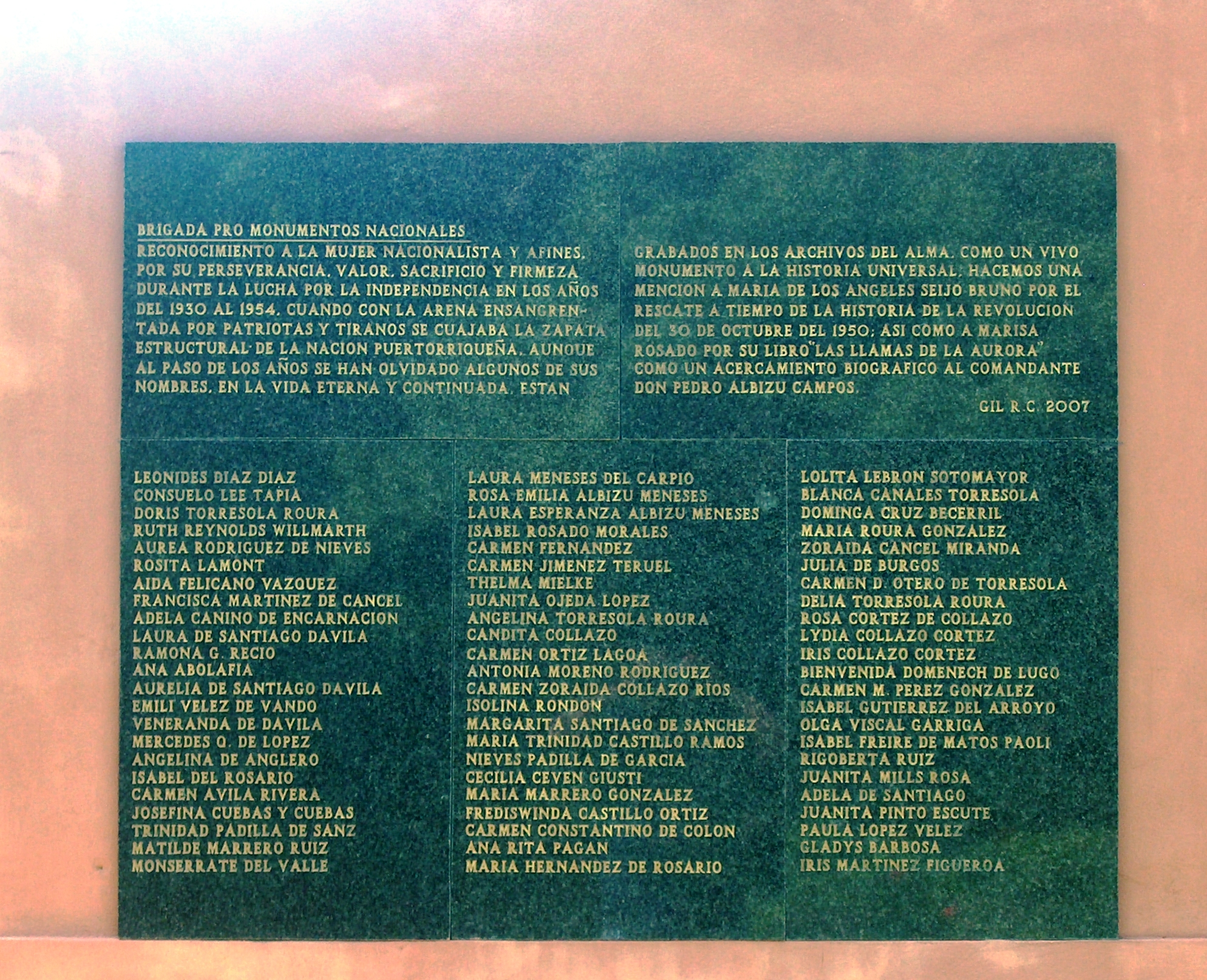
Plaque honoring the women of the Puerto Rican Nationalist Party

== See also ==
- Puerto Rican Nationalist Party
- Ducoudray Holstein Expedition
- Grito de Lares
- Intentona de Yauco
- Ponce massacre
- Río Piedras massacre
- Puerto Rican Nationalist Party Revolts of the 1950s
- Jayuya Uprising
- Utuado Uprising
- Truman assassination attempt
- Puerto Rican Independence Party
- List of Puerto Ricans
- List of incidents of civil unrest in the United States
