= Lola Rodríguez de Tió =

Puerto Rican-born poet

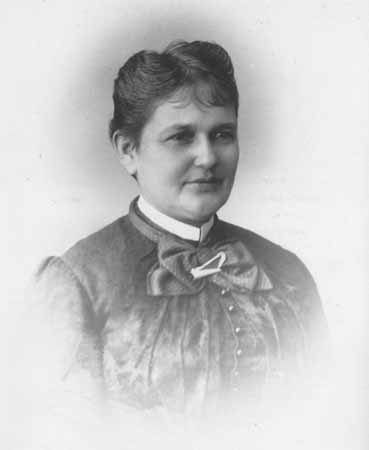
- Lola Rodríguez de Tió
- Born: Dolores Rodríguez de Astudillo y Ponce de León; September 14, 1843; San Germán, Puerto Rico
- Died: November 10, 1924 (aged 81); Havana, Cuba
- Occupation: poet

Lola Rodríguez de Tió (September 14, 1843 – November 10, 1924) was a Puerto Rican woman who established herself a reputation as a great poet throughout all of Latin America. A believer in women's rights, she was also committed to the abolition of slavery and the independence of Puerto Rico.

== Early years ==
Rodríguez de Tió was born Dolores Rodríguez de Astudillo y Ponce de León in San Germán, Puerto Rico. Her father, Sebastián Rodríguez de Astudillo, was one of the founding members of the Ilustre Colegio de Abogados de Puerto Rico (literally, "Illustrious College of Attorneys," the governing body for Spanish attorneys in Puerto Rico, similar to a bar association). Lola's mother, Carmen Ponce de León, was a descendant of Juan Ponce de León, who was an explorer, and the first Spanish Governor of Puerto Rico. She too was a native of the town of San Germán and lived at what is now known as Casa de los Ponce de León. Rodríguez de Tió received her education at home where she was home-tutored. She developed a lifelong love for literature, especially for the works of Fray Luis de León which were to serve her as a source of inspiration. She was very assertive in her early years, at the age of seventeen she demanded to be allowed to wear her hair short, which went against the conventional norm of the time, a personal trademark that she kept through her life.

== Political activist ==
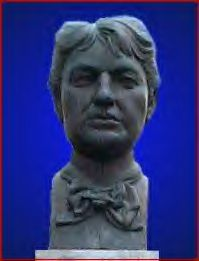
Bust of Lola Rodríguez de Tió

Rodríguez de Tió moved to Mayagüez, with her family. There she met Bonocio Tió Segarra, whom she married in 1863. Rodríguez de Tió became a writer and book importer who often wrote articles in the local press and was as much of an activist against the Spanish regime as was allowed by the government. After marrying Tió, she published her first book of poetry, "Mis Cantos", which sold the then amazing amount of 2,500 copies.

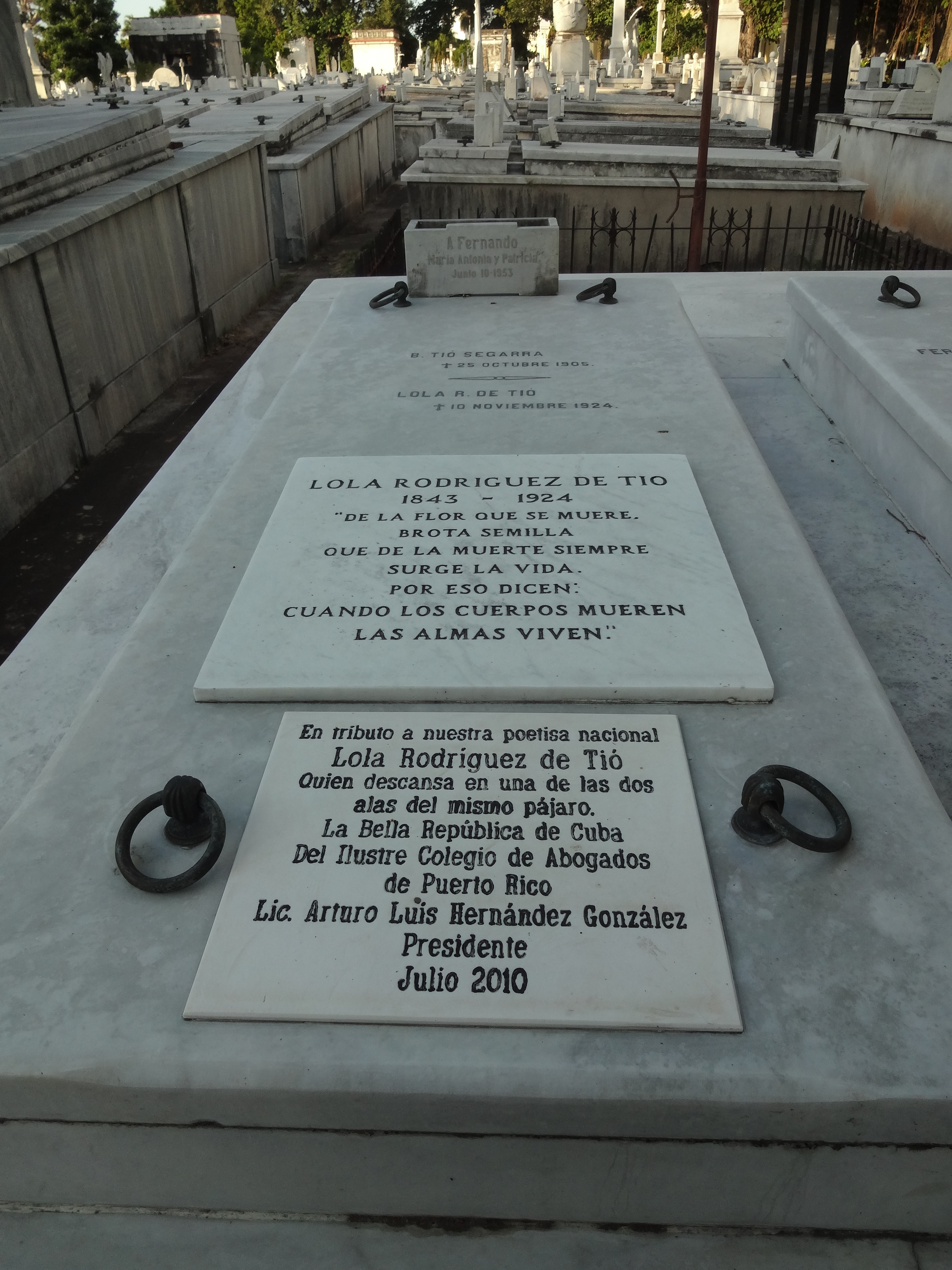
Grave at Colon Cemetery in Havana

In 1867 and then again in 1889, Rodríguez de Tió and her husband were banished from Puerto Rico by the Spanish appointed Governors. On their first exile they went to Venezuela and on their second banishment they first moved to New York where she helped José Martí and other Cuban revolutionaries, and later to Cuba, where the couple resided until their respective deaths. Their home became a gathering point for politicians and intellectuals as well as exiled Puerto Ricans. In 1868, inspired by Ramón Emeterio Betances's quest for Puerto Rico's independence and by the attempted revolution called the Grito de Lares, she wrote the patriotic lyrics to the existing tune of La Borinqueña. In 1901, Rodríguez de Tió founded and was elected member to the Cuban Academy of Arts and Letters. She was also an inspector of the local school system. She was well known in Cuba for her patriotic poetry about Puerto Rico and Cuba. Some of Rodríguez de Tió's best known works are "Cuba y Puerto Rico son..." (Cuba and Puerto Rico are..) and "Mi Libro de Cuba" (My Book about Cuba).

In 1919, Rodríguez de Tió returned to Puerto Rico where she was honored with a great banquet at the Ateneo Puertorriqueño after she recited her "Cantos a Puerto Rico". Lola Rodríguez de Tió died on November 10, 1924, and is buried at the Colón Cemetery in Havana, Cuba.

== Legacy ==
It is believed by some that the design and colors of the Puerto Rican Flag, which were adopted in 1954, came from Rodríguez de Tió's idea of having the same flag as Cuba with the colors reversed. Puerto Rico has honored Lola's memory by naming schools and avenues after her.

On May 29, 2014, The Legislative Assembly of Puerto Rico honored 12 illustrious women with plaques in the "La Plaza en Honor a la Mujer Puertorriqueña" (Plaza in Honor of Puerto Rican Women) in San Juan. According to the plaques the 12 women, who by virtue of their merits and legacies, stand out in the history of Puerto Rico. Rodríguez de Tió was among those who were honored.

== Lyrics to the revolutionary version of "La Boriqueña" ==
External audio
- You may listen to Rodríguez de Tió's version of the "La Borinqueña" on YouTube interpreted by Puerto Rican singer Danny Rivera.

The following are the lyrics to Lola Rodríguez de Tió's 1868 revolutionary version of "La Boriqueña":

Revolutionary version of "La Boriqueña" by Lola Rodríguez de Tió
Spanish (original version)	English translation
¡Despierta, borinqueño que han dado la señal! ¡Despierta de ese sueño que es hora de luchar!	Arise, Puerto Rican! The call to arms has sounded! Awake from this dream, for it is time to fight!
A ese llamar patriótico ¿no arde tu corazón? ¡Ven! Nos será simpático el ruido del cañón.	Doesn't this patriotic call set your heart alight? Come! We will be in tune with the roar of the cannon.
Mira, ya el cubano libre será; le dará el machete su libertad... le dará el machete su libertad.	Come, the Cubans will soon be free; the machete will give him his liberty.
Ya el tambor guerrero dice en su son, que es la manigua el sitio, el sitio de la reunión, de la reunión... de la reunión.	Now the war drum says with its sound, that the countryside is the place of the meeting... of the meeting.
El Grito de Lares se ha de repetir, y entonces sabremos vencer o morir.	The Cry of Lares must be repeated, and then we will know: victory or death.
Bellísima Borinquén, a Cuba hay que seguir; tú tienes bravos hijos que quieren combatir.	Beautiful Puerto Rico must follow Cuba; you have brave sons who wish to fight.
ya por más tiempo impávido no podemos estar, ya no queremos, tímidos dejarnos subyugar.	Now, no longer can we be unmoved; now we do not want timidly to let them subjugate us.
Nosotros queremos ser libres ya, y nuestro machete afilado está. y nuestro machete afilado está.	We want to be free now, and our machete has been sharpened.
¿Por qué, entonces, nosotros hemos de estar, tan dormidos y sordos y sordos a esa señal? a esa señal, a esa señal?	Why then have we been so sleepy and deaf to the call?
No hay que temer, riqueños al ruido del cañón, ¡que salvar a la patria es deber del corazón!	There is no need to fear, Puerto Ricans, the roar of the cannon; saving the motherland is the duty of the heart.
ya no queremos déspotas, caiga el tirano ya, las mujeres indómitas también sabrán luchar.	We no longer want despots, may the tyrant fall now; the unconquerable women also will know how to fight.
Nosotros queremos la libertad, y nuestros machetes nos la darán... y nuestro machete nos la dará...	We want liberty, and our machetes will give it to us... and our machetes will give it to us...
Vámonos, borinqueños, vámonos ya, que nos espera ansiosa, ansiosa la libertad. ¡La libertad, la libertad!	Come, Puerto Ricans, come now, for freedom awaits for us anxiously, freedom, freedom!

== Bibliography ==
As listed by the Hispanic Division of the Library of Congress, The World of 1898: The Spanish-American War.

=== Major works ===
- A mi patria en la muerte de Corchado (1885)
- Cantares, nieblas y congojas (1968)
- Claros de sol (1968)
- Claros y nieblas (1885)
- Mi libro de Cuba (1893)
- Mi ofrenda (1880)
- Mis cantares (1876)
- Nochebuena (1887)
- Obras completas (1968)
- Poesías (1960)
- Poesías patrióticas, poesías religiosas (1968)
- Trabajos literarios (1882)
- La borinqueña (song lyrics to a native dance, 1868)

== Newspaper articles by Lola Rodríguez de Tió ==
- La democracia, June 07, 1905, Page 4, Image 4, Chronicling America, Library of Congress.
- La democracia., April 03, 1903, Image 1, Chronicling America, Library of Congress.
- Verses under "Autógrafo" published on La democracia., May 20, 1899, Image 3, Chronicling America, Library of Congress.
- Letter about "La cuestión Huntington," published on La democracia., December 19, 1893, Page 3, Image 3, Chronicling America, Library of Congress.
- Poem "A una golondrina" published on La democracia., November 02, 1893, Page 3, Image 3, Chronicling America, Library of Congress.
- Letter to Don Ramón Marín, published on La democracia., May 21, 1892, Page 2, Image 2, Chronicling America, Library of Congress.

== Ancestry ==
Ancestors of Lola Rodríguez de Tió

4. Francisco José Rodríguez de Astudillo; b. 1761 Cumaná, Sucre, Venezuela
2. Don Sebastián Rodríguez de Astudillo y Ramírez del Postigo
10. Francisco Xavier Ramírez del Postigo y Vidal; b. 1735, Montilla, Córdoba, Spain
5. María del Socorro Ramírez del Postigo y Ortiz de la Peña; b. 1788, San Germán, Puerto Rico
11. María Candelaria Ortiz de Peña y del Toro y Quiñones; b. 1745, San Germán, Puerto Rico
1. Dolores (Lola) Rodríguez de Astudillo y Ponce de León; b. 1848, San Germán, Puerto Rico
12. Clemente Antonio Ponce de León y de la Seda; b. 1761, San Germán, Puerto Rico
6. Don José Antonio Ponce de León y del Toro y Quiñones; b. 1792, San Germán, Puerto Rico
13. Baltazara del Toro y Quiñones y Rodriguez; b. 1792
3. Doña María del Carmen Ponce de León y Martínez Mariño; b. San Germán, Puerto Rico
14. Zenón Martínez; b. Benafalsa, Castile, Spain
7. Doña María Vicenta Martínez Mariño
15. María Mariño; b. Pontevedra, Galicia, Spain

== See also ==
- List of Puerto Ricans
- List of Puerto Rican writers
- Puerto Rican literature
- History of women in Puerto Rico

19th-century female leaders of the Puerto Rican Independence Movement

- María de las Mercedes Barbudo
- Mariana Bracetti

Female members of the Puerto Rican Nationalist Party

- Blanca Canales
- Rosa Collazo
- Lolita Lebrón
- Ruth Mary Reynolds
- Isabel Rosado
- Isabel Freire de Matos
- Isolina Rondón
- Olga Viscal Garriga

Articles related to the Puerto Rican Independence Movement

- Puerto Rican Nationalist Party Revolts of the 1950s
- Puerto Rican Nationalist Party
- Ponce massacre
- Río Piedras massacre
- Puerto Rican Independence Party
- Grito de Lares
- Intentona de Yauco
- United States of Banana
