= Isolina Rondón =

Puerto Rican independence advocate

- Born: April 11, 1913; Río Piedras, Puerto Rico
- Died: October 2, 1990 (aged 77); New York City, NY
- Monuments: Puerto Rican Independence
- Political party: Puerto Rican Nationalist Party
- Movement: Puerto Rican Independence

Notes
- Rondón was the Treasurer of the Puerto Rican Nationalist Party from 1936 to 1946

Isolina Rondón (April 11, 1913 – October 2, 1990) was a political activist. She was one of the few witnesses of the killing of four Nationalists committed by local police officers in Puerto Rico during a confrontation with the supporters of the Nationalist Party that occurred on October 24, 1935, and which is known as the Río Piedras massacre. Rondón joined the political movement and became the Treasurer of the Puerto Rican Nationalist Party which staged various uprisings in Puerto Rico against the colonial Government of the United States in 1950.

== Early years ==
Rondón was born in Río Piedras, Puerto Rico, and was raised by her mother upon her father's death. Her mother was a housekeeper and at times Rondón helped. after Rondón began her primary education in her hometown and after completing her eighth grade she attended a secretarial school. She went on to study at the University of Puerto Rico where she worked in the office of the Dean of Social Sciences.

Her cousin was a member of the faction of the Puerto Rican Union Party which believed in Puerto Rican independence. On September 17, 1922, three political organizations joined forces and formed the Puerto Rican Nationalist Party. Her cousin followed José Coll y Cuchí, a former member of the Puerto Rican Union Party, and the founder of the nationalist Party. In 1924 Dr. Pedro Albizu Campos joined the party and was named vice-president. Rondón was influenced by her cousins political ideals.

== Nationalist ==
Rondón attended the local Nationalist Party meetings with her cousin at the house of Albizu Campos in Río Piedras. Together with other devotees she made daily visits to the house. Eventually Rondon was asked by Albizu Campos to take notes at the meetings and it wasn't long before Rondón became his personal secretary.

=== Río Piedras massacre ===
On October 23, 1935, a group of students at the university began a signature collection campaign with the intention of declaring Albizu Campos "Student Enemy Number One". A protest against the group by the pro-nationalist faction of students in turn denounced Chardón and the Liberal Party as instigators and agents of the United States.

A student assembly was held at the university on Oct. 24, where Albizu Campos was declared "Persona non-grata". Chardón requested that the governor provide and place armed police officers on the grounds of the university in case the situation turned violent. A couple of police officers spotted what they believed to be a suspicious looking automobile and asked the driver Ramón S. Pagán, secretary of the Nationalist Party, who was accompanied by his friend Pedro Quiñones, for his license. A fight between the men in the car and the police soon followed which resulted in the death of Pagán and Quiñones. According to the local newspaper "El Mundo" of Oct. 25th, an explosion, followed by gunfire, was heard resulting in the additional deaths of Eduardo Rodríguez Vega and José Santiago Barea.

Rondón watched from her front door on Calle Brumbaugh, near the University of Puerto Rico, as the police shot into the car carrying the four Nationalists. Rondón, testified how she saw the police officers shooting at the victims and how she heard one police officer screaming "do not to let them escape alive". However, her testimony, as to the incident which became known as the Río Piedras massacre, was ignored and there were no charges raised against the officers. They were instead given a promotion. That same year, Albizu Campos was arrested and sent to Atlanta Penitentiary.

=== Nationalist Party Revolts of the 1950s ===
On May 21, 1948, a bill was introduced before the Puerto Rican Senate which would restrain the rights of the independence and nationalist movements on the archipelago. The Senate, which at the time was controlled by the Partido Popular Democrático (PPD) and presided by Luis Muñoz Marín, approved the bill. This bill, which resembled the anti-communist Smith Act passed in the United States in 1940, became known as the Ley de la Mordaza (Gag Law, technically "Law 53 of 1948") when the U.S.-appointed governor of Puerto Rico, Jesús T. Piñero, signed it into law on June 10, 1948. Under this new law it became a crime to print, publish, sell, or exhibit any material intended to paralyze or destroy the insular government; or to organize any society, group or assembly of people with a similar destructive intent. It made it illegal to sing a patriotic song, and reinforced the 1898 law that had made it illegal to display the Flag of Puerto Rico, with anyone found guilty of disobeying the law in any way being subject to a sentence of up to ten years imprisonment, a fine of up to US$10,000 (equivalent to $134,000 in 2025), or both. According to Dr. Leopoldo Figueroa, a non-PPD member of the Puerto Rico House of Representatives, the law was repressive and was in violation of the First Amendment of the US Constitution which guarantees Freedom of Speech. He pointed out that the law as such was a violation of the civil rights of the people of Puerto Rico.

On October 30, 1950, on the orders of Albizu Campos, the Puerto Rican Nationalist Party staged various uprisings, in what is known as the Puerto Rican Nationalist Party Revolts of the 1950s, in various towns, among them Peñuelas, Mayagüez, Naranjito, Arecibo and Ponce, of which the most notable occurrences being in Utuado uprising, where the insurgents were massacred, Jayuya uprising, the town where the "Free Republic of Puerto Rico" was declared, and which was heavily damaged by the military in response to the insurrection, and in San Juan where the Nationalists made an attempt against then-Governor Luis Muñoz Marín at his residence "La Fortaleza". The uprisings failed and hundreds of Nationalists were rounded up and arrested.

On April 15, 1952, she was interviewed by the FBI in her Rio Piedras apartment in regard to the uprisings. She stated that she had been treasurer of the Nationalist Party from 1936 to 1946. Rondón also stated that any actions taken by the party were a result of the inspiration of Albizu Campos. On May 20, she was asked if Albizu Campos used any of the Party's funds for himself and she stated no, she also insisted that any questions in regard to the Nationalist Party should be directed at Albizu Campos, since he is the spokesperson of the party's ideals. She was then asked if Albizu Campos gave the order that resulted in the Nationalist Uprisings of October 30, 1950, and she responded that Albizu Campos was unaware of many of the actions which involved the Nationalists. She stated that to the best of her knowledge Albizu Campos had nothing to do with the uprisings.

== Later years ==
Isolina Rondón continued to be active in Puerto Rico's Independent movement. She acted as the secretary of the Nationalist Party. She died on October 2, 1990, in New York City.

There is a plaque, located at the monument to the Jayuya Uprising participants in Mayagüez, Puerto Rico, honoring the women of the Puerto Rican Nationalist Party. Rondón's name is on the fourteenth line of the second (middle) plate.

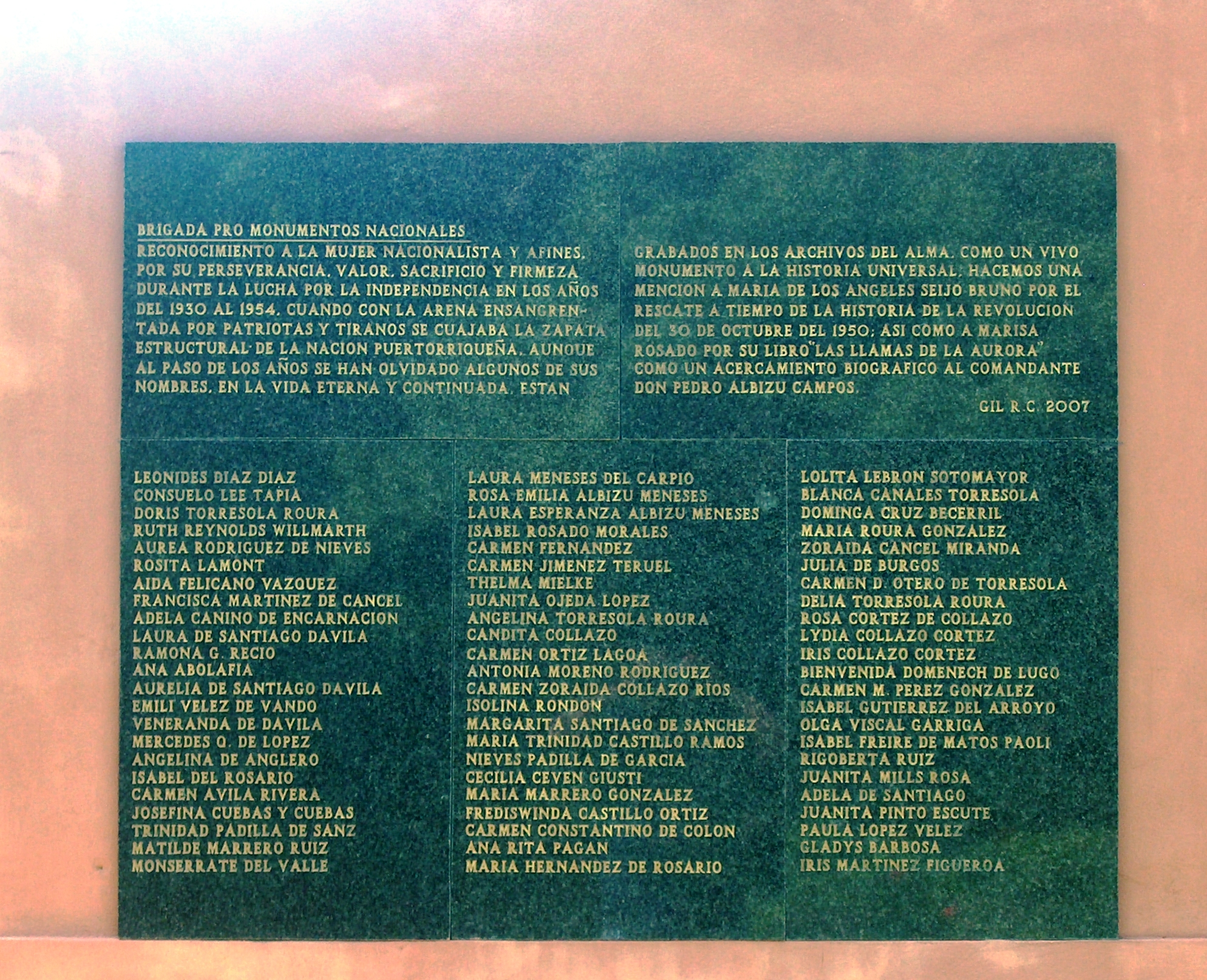
Plaque honoring the women of the Puerto Rican Nationalist Party

== See also ==
- List of Puerto Ricans
- History of women in Puerto Rico

19th Century female leaders of the Puerto Rican Independence Movement

- María de las Mercedes Barbudo
- Lola Rodríguez de Tió
- Mariana Bracetti

Female members of the Puerto Rican Nationalist Party

- Blanca Canales
- Rosa Collazo
- Julia de Burgos
- Lolita Lebrón
- Ruth Mary Reynolds
- Isabel Rosado
- Isabel Freire de Matos
- Olga Viscal Garriga

Articles related to the Puerto Rican Independence Movement

- Puerto Rican Nationalist Party Revolts of the 1950s
- Puerto Rican Nationalist Party
- Ponce massacre
- Río Piedras massacre
- Puerto Rican Independence Party
- Grito de Lares
- Intentona de Yauco
