= Brazo de Oro =

Brazo de Oro is a nickname which may refer to:

- Brazo de Oro (wrestler) (1959–2017), Mexican Luchador (professional wrestler)
- Mariana Bracetti (1825–1903), leader of the Puerto Rico independence movement in the 1860s
