= Olga Viscal Garriga =

Puerto Rican politician and independence advocate

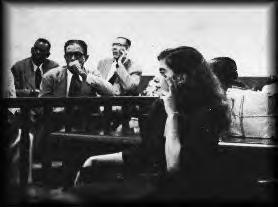
- Viscal Garriga on trial for refusing to recognize U.S. authority over Puerto Rico
- Born: May 5, 1929; Brooklyn, New York
- Died: June 1, 1995 (aged 65); San Juan, Puerto Rico
- Political party: Puerto Rican Nationalist Party
- Movement: Puerto Rican Independence
- Children: Pedro, Olga, and Maria Luz

Olga Isabel Viscal Garriga (May 5, 1929 – June 1, 1995) was a public orator and political activist. Born in Brooklyn, New York, she moved to Puerto Rico, where she was a student leader and spokesperson of the Puerto Rican Nationalist Party's branch in Rio Piedras. As an advocate for Puerto Rican independence, she was sentenced to eight years in a U.S. federal penitentiary, for refusing to recognize the sovereign authority of the United States over Puerto Rico.

== Early years ==
Olga Isabel Viscal Garriga was born in Brooklyn, New York in 1929. Her parents, Francisco Viscal Bravo and Laura Garriga Gonzalez, had moved there from Puerto Rico in the early 1920s. Olga was one of seven children born to the couple. The children were the fourth-great-grandchildren of Field Marshal Don Juan Andres Daban y Busterino, who served as the Spanish-appointed Governor and General Captain of Puerto Rico from 1783 to 1789. Her parents returned with the family to Puerto Rico, settling in Rio Piedras. Viscal was raised and educated there, after having witnessed discrimination against Puerto Ricans in New York. As she grew up, she strongly disagreed with U.S. policies that limited human rights, freedom of speech, and self-determination in Puerto Rico.

== Student activist ==
Viscal enrolled in the University of Puerto Rico, where she earned her Doctoral Degree in Political Sciences. During the late 1940s, and while finishing her Ph.D., she became a student leader and spokesperson of the Puerto Rican Nationalist Party's branch in Rio Piedras. The Party was headed by Dr. Pedro Albizu Campos, and favored the forceful expulsion of the U.S. from Puerto Rico.

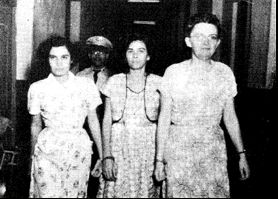
The arrest of (L to R) Nationalists Carmen María Pérez Gonzalez, Olga Viscal Garriga and Ruth Mary Reynolds on November 2, 1950

On May 21, 1948, a bill was introduced before the Puerto Rican Senate which would restrain the rights of the independence and Nationalist movements in the archipelago. The Senate, controlled by the Partido Popular Democrático (PPD) and presided by Luis Muñoz Marín, approved the bill that day. This bill, which resembled the anti-communist Smith Act passed in the United States in 1940, became known as the Ley de la Mordaza (Gag Law) when the U.S.-appointed governor of Puerto Rico, Jesús T. Piñero, signed it into law on June 10, 1948.

Under this new law it would be a crime to print, publish, sell, or exhibit any material intended to paralyze or destroy the insular government; or to organize any society, group or assembly of people with a similar destructive intent. It made it illegal to sing a patriotic song, and reinforced the 1898 law that had made it illegal to display the Flag of Puerto Rico, with anyone found guilty of disobeying the law in any way being subject to a sentence of up to ten years imprisonment, a fine of up to US$10,000 (equivalent to $134,000 in 2025), or both.

Viscal, who befriended Dr. Pedro Albizu Campos, was a talented orator and political activist. Although she was not directly involved in any violent act in 1950, Viscal was arrested because she participated in a demonstration that turned deadly in Old San Juan, after the police and other authorities opened fire on the demonstrators, one of whom was killed. She was detained on November 2, along with Carmen María Pérez Roque and Ruth Mary Reynolds (The American/Puerto Rican Nationalist) and held in the La Princesa jail. During her trial in the federal court in Old San Juan, she was uncooperative with the U.S. government prosecution and refused to recognize the authority of the U.S. over Puerto Rico. She was sentenced to eight years in prison for contempt of court, and released after serving five.

== Later years ==
After her release from prison, Viscal went to Cuba, where she was the Puerto Rican representative to the Cuban Parliament. As such, she met with Fidel Castro and Che Guevara. She was a devout Catholic, and thus became disillusioned with Castro's politics and selectively atheist policies. After publicly criticizing Castro, she escaped from Cuba with the help of her younger sister, Irma. Olga Viscal Garriga died in June 1995 in San Juan, Puerto Rico. She was the mother of three children, Pedro, Olga and Maria Luz. She was buried at Porta Coeli Cemetery in Bayamón, Puerto Rico.

== Legacy ==
Viscal Garriga was the inspiration for the main character Antígona, in the play La Pasión Según Antígona Pérez (The Passion According to Antígona Pérez), written by Puerto Rican playwright Luis Rafael Sánchez.

There is a plaque, located at the monument to the Jayuya Uprising participants in Mayagüez, Puerto Rico, honoring the women of the Puerto Rican Nationalist Party. Viscal Garriga's name is on the fifteenth line of the third plate.

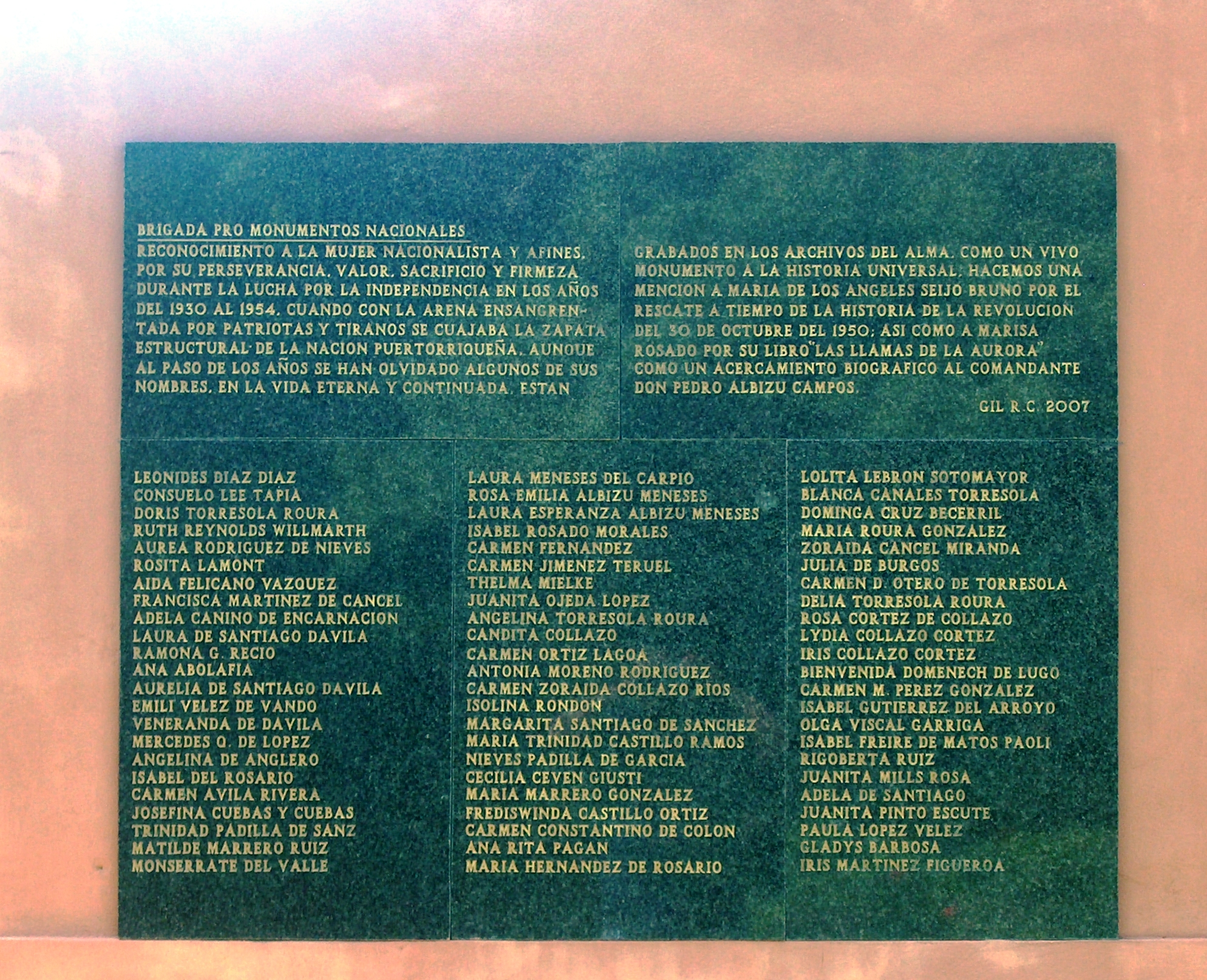
Plaque honoring the women of the Puerto Rican Nationalist Party

== See also ==
- List of Puerto Ricans
- History of women in Puerto Rico

19th Century female leaders of the Puerto Rican Independence Movement

- María de las Mercedes Barbudo
- Lola Rodríguez de Tió
- Mariana Bracetti

Female members of the Puerto Rican Nationalist Party

- Blanca Canales
- Rosa Collazo
- Julia de Burgos
- Lolita Lebrón
- Ruth Mary Reynolds
- Isabel Rosado
- Isabel Freire de Matos
- Isolina Rondón

Articles related to the Puerto Rican Independence Movement

- Puerto Rican Nationalist Party Revolts of the 1950s
- Puerto Rican Nationalist Party
- Ponce massacre
- Río Piedras massacre
- Puerto Rican Independence Party
- Grito de Lares
- Intentona de Yauco
