= Isabel Rosado =

Puerto Rican educator, social worker, and independence advocate

- Born: Isabel Rosado Morales; November 5, 1907; Ceiba, Puerto Rico
- Died: January 13, 2015 (aged 107); Fajardo, Puerto Rico
- Political party: Puerto Rican Nationalist Party

Isabel Rosado (November 5, 1907 – January 13, 2015), also known as Doña Isabelita, was an educator, social worker, activist and member of the Puerto Rican Nationalist Party. Influenced by the events of the Ponce massacre, Rosado became a believer of the Puerto Rican independence movement and was imprisoned because of her commitment to the cause.

== Early years ==
Rosado (birth name: Isabel Rosado Morales was born in Barrio Chupacallos in the town of Ceiba, Puerto Rico to Simon Rosado and Petra Morales. Her father was a leader in the barrio and was often sought by the people of the barrio for his opinion on local matters regarding the community.

Rosado received her primary and secondary education in the public schools of the towns of Ceiba, Fajardo and Naguabo. Isabelita, as she was known, was only eighteen years old when she became a student at the University of Puerto Rico. She earned her teachers certificate there. For years, Rosado taught at the rural schools in the towns of Ceiba and Humacao.

== Sociedad Insular de Trabajadores Sociales ==
Alongside Blanca Canales, Carmen Rivera de Alvarado and other women, she was a founding member of La Sociedad Insular de Trabajadores Sociales, known today as Colegio de Trabajadores Sociales de Puerto Rico.

== Ponce massacre ==
On March 21, 1937, Rosado was listening to the radio, where she heard the events involving what is known as the Ponce massacre. That day the Puerto Rican Nationalist Party held a peaceful march in the city of Ponce, Puerto Rico, commemorating the ending of slavery in Puerto Rico by the governing Spanish National Assembly in 1873, and coinciding with a protest against the incarceration by the government of the United States of America government of nationalist leader Pedro Albizu Campos on sedition charges, The participants and innocent bystanders were fired upon by the Insular Police, resulting in the death of 17 unarmed civilians and two policemen, plus the wounding of some 235 civilians, including women and children. The Insular Police, a force somewhat resembling the National Guard, answered to orders of the U.S. appointed governor of Puerto Rico, General Blanton Winship. The outcome of the Ponce massacre served as an influential factor in her decision to join the Nationalist Party and to become a follower of Pedro Albizu Campos.

== Puerto Rican Nationalist Party Revolts of the 1950s ==
On May 21, 1948, a bill was introduced before the Puerto Rican Senate which would restrain the rights of the independence and nationalist movements on the archipelago. The Senate, which at the time was controlled by the Partido Popular Democrático (PPD) and presided by Luis Muñoz Marín, approved the bill. This bill, which resembled the anti-communist Smith Act passed in the United States in 1940, became known as the Ley de la Mordaza (Gag Law, technically "Law 53 of 1948") when the U.S.-appointed governor of Puerto Rico, Jesús T. Piñero, signed it into law on June 10, 1948. Under this new law it became a crime to print, publish, sell, or exhibit any material intended to paralyze or destroy the insular government; or to organize any society, group or assembly of people with a similar destructive intent. It made it illegal to sing a patriotic song, and reinforced the 1898 law that had made it illegal to display the Flag of Puerto Rico, with anyone found guilty of disobeying the law in any way being subject to a sentence of up to ten years imprisonment, a fine of up to US$10,000 (equivalent to $134,000 in 2025), or both. According to Dr. Leopoldo Figueroa, a non-PPD member of the Puerto Rico House of Representatives, the law was repressive and was in violation of the First Amendment of the US Constitution which guarantees Freedom of Speech. He pointed out that the law as such was a violation of the civil rights of the people of Puerto Rico.

On October 30, 1950, Nationalist leader Pedro Albizu Campos ordered an uprising by the against United States Government rule of Puerto Rico and against the approval of the creation of the political status "Free Associated State" ("Estado Libre Associado") for Puerto Rico which was considered a colonial farce.

The uprisings occurred in various towns, among them Peñuelas, Mayagüez, Naranjito, Arecibo and Ponce, of which the most notable occurrences being in Utuado, where the insurgents were massacred, Jayuya, the town where the "Free Republic of Puerto Rico" was declared, and which was heavily damaged by the military in response to the insurrection, and in San Juan where the Nationalists made an attempt against then-Governor Luis Muñoz Marín at his residence "La Fortaleza".

Rosado was accused in participating in the revolts. Rosado was sentenced to serve fifteen months in jail and fired from her job. Since she was unable to earn a living in the public school system, she obtained a position in a private school.

On March 1, 1954, four Puerto Rican nationalists, Lolita Lebrón, Rafael Cancel Miranda, Andres Figueroa Cordero, and Irvin Flores Rodríguez, shot 30 rounds from semi-automatic pistols from the Ladies' Gallery (a balcony for visitors) of the House of Representatives chamber in the United States Capitol.

On March 6, 1954, she was in the Nationalist office with the Nationalists Pepe Sotomayor, Doris Torresola Roura, Carmín Pérez and Albizu Campos. The police arrived and raided the facilities. The following morning the police attacked the Nationalist headquarters in San Juan with tear gas. Albizu Campos was carried out unconscious and those in the building, including Rosado were arrested and imprisoned. Rosado was sentenced to serve eleven years in prison. She was released from prison in 1965, via a Habeas Corpus.

== Later years ==
In 1979, Rosado participated in an ecumenical prayer service on Vieques naval territory. She was among a group of protestors against the occupation of the small island by the U.S. Navy. Rosado was handcuffed and taken to the police station by the local authorities. She was released soon after.

Unable to find a job, Rosado makes a living sewing and crocheting. She continues to be active in everything involving the pro-Puerto Rican independence movement.

A documentary was made called "Isabel Rosado: Nacionalista" was made with the intention of uncovering decades of unknown history of this island and encourage discussions on political repression, surveillance, and human rights violations.

Isabel Rosado Morales died on January 13, 2015, of natural causes at the Sagradas Misiones de la Misericordia (Sacred Missions of Mercy) hospice in Fajardo, Puerto Rico, where she resided. She was 107 years old at the time of her death. She was buried at The Ceiba Municipal Cemetery in Ceiba, Puerto Rico. Nationalist leader Rafael Cancel Miranda made the following statement:

A national heritage such as Doña Isabelita, will live forever in the hearts of her people. She will remain a patriotic example for generations to come.

There is a plaque, located at the monument to the Jayuya Uprising participants in Mayagüez, Puerto Rico, honoring the women of the Puerto Rican Nationalist Party. Rosado's name is on the fourth line of the second (middle) plate.

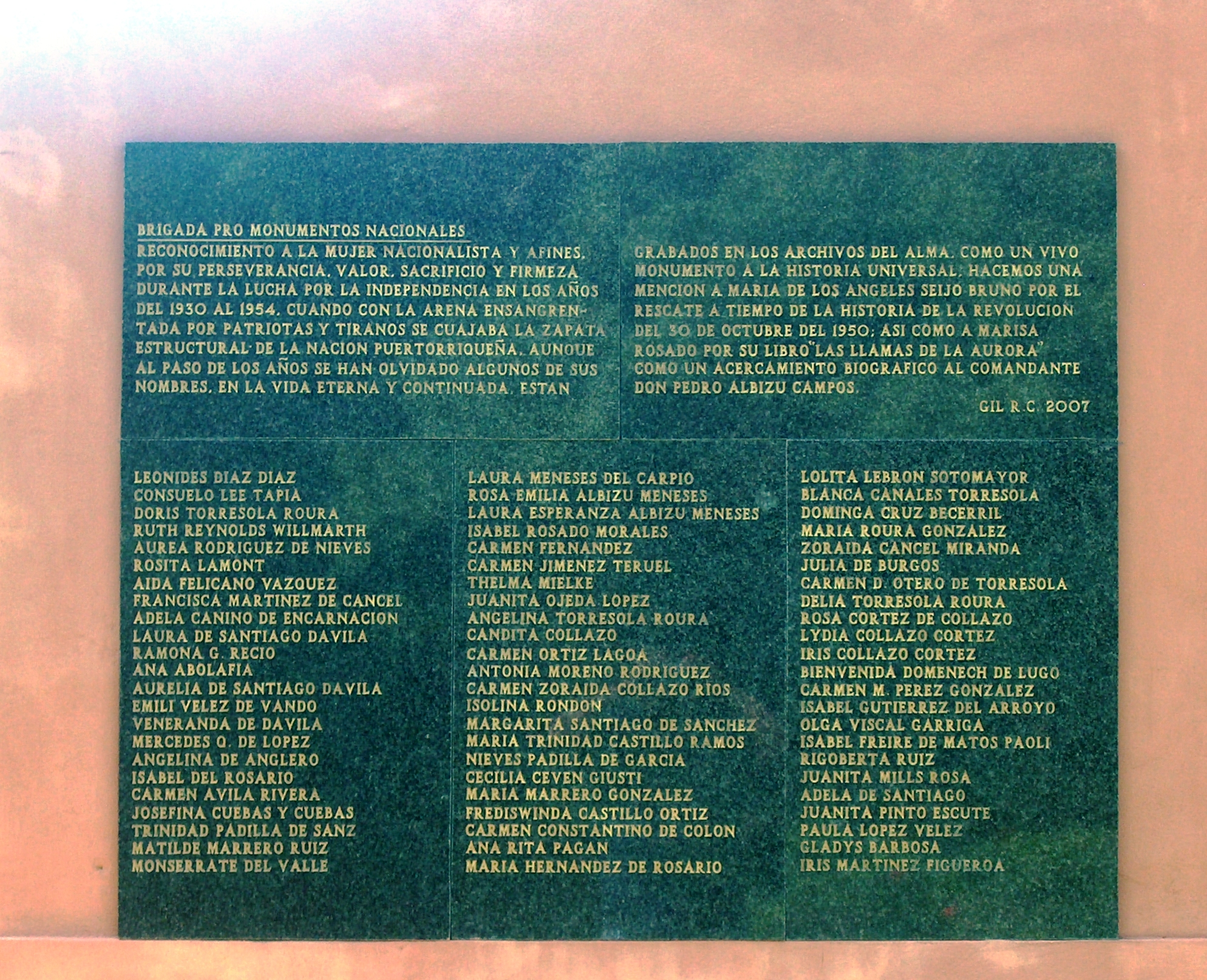
Plaque honoring the women of the Puerto Rican Nationalist Party

== See also ==
- List of Puerto Ricans
- History of women in Puerto Rico

19th Century female leaders of the Puerto Rican Independence Movement

- María de las Mercedes Barbudo
- Lola Rodríguez de Tió
- Mariana Bracetti

Female members of the Puerto Rican Nationalist Party

- Blanca Canales
- Rosa Collazo
- Julia de Burgos
- Lolita Lebrón
- Ruth Mary Reynolds
- Isabel Freire de Matos
- Isolina Rondón
- Olga Viscal Garriga

Articles related to the Puerto Rican Independence Movement

- Puerto Rican Nationalist Party Revolts of the 1950s
- Puerto Rican Nationalist Party
- Ponce massacre
- Río Piedras massacre
- Puerto Rican Independence Party
- Grito de Lares
- Intentona de Yauco
