= Antonio Valero de Bernabé =

Puerto Rican general

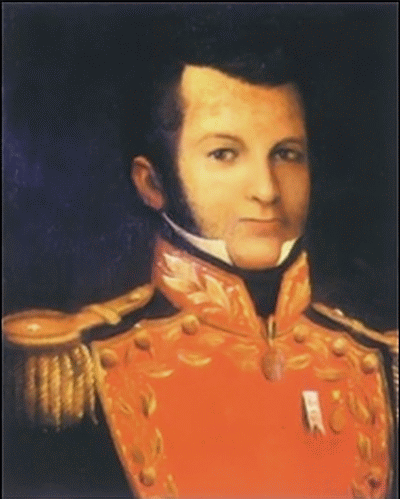
- Brigadier General Antonio Valero de Bernabé
- Born: Antonio Valero de Bernabé Pacheco; October 26, 1790; Fajardo, Captaincy General of Puerto Rico, Spanish Empire
- Died: June 7, 1863 (aged 72); Bogotá, Cundinamarca, Colombia
- Military career
- Allegiance: Spanish Army, Mexican Revolutionary Army, Venezuelan Patriot Army
- Service years: 1807–1863
- Rank: Brigadier General
- Commands: Military Chief of the Department of Panama, Governor of Puerto Cabello, Chief of Staff of Colombia, Minister of War and Maritime of Venezuela
- Conflicts: Second Siege of Zaragoza; Mexican War of Independence; Spanish American wars of independence
- Awards: The Bust of the Liberator of Venezuela, The Medal of the Liberators of Mexico, The Bust of the Liberator of Peru, Medal del Callao

Antonio Vicente Miguel Valero de Bernabé Pacheco (October 26, 1790 – June 7, 1863), also known as "The Liberator from Puerto Rico", was a Puerto Rican military leader. Trained in Spain, he fought with the Spanish Army to expel Napoleon from the Iberian Peninsula and was promoted to colonel during these years. A variant of his name, Manuel Antonio Valero, has been adopted by some historians, but it is not present in official documentation nor was it used by him.

Valero de Bernabé had recently graduated from the military academy when Napoleon convinced King Charles IV of Spain to permit the French leader to pass through Spain with his army to attack Portugal. When Napoleon later refused to leave Spanish soil, the government declared war. Valero de Bernabé joined the Spanish Army and fought as an official of the Murcia Division of Spain, helping to defeat Napoleon's army at the Siege of Zaragoza in the Peninsular War, also known as the Spanish War of Independence. During this conflict, he was involved in the defense of the Arrabal, holding his position despite the French advance and being taken prisoner as a result. After this action, Valero de Bernabé was awarded many decorations and promoted to the rank of colonel at the age of 19.

When Ferdinand VII became King of Spain in 1813, Valero de Bernabé was critical of the new king's policies towards the Spanish colonies in Latin America. He developed a keen hatred of the monarchy, resigned his commission in the army, and in 1821 emigrated to Mexico with his family. There he joined the Army of the Three Guarantees headed by Agustín de Iturbide and was appointed as Chief of Staff. He successfully fought for Mexico's independence from Spain, achieved in 1821, after which the people proclaimed Iturbide the Emperor of Mexico and Valero de Bernabé was promoted to the rank of brigadier general. Since Valero de Bernabé had developed anti-monarchist feelings following his experiences in Spain, he led an unsuccessful revolt against Iturbide. He fled the country, but was captured by a Spanish pirate and handed over to the authorities in Cuba, where he was imprisoned. He later escaped with the help of a group of secessionists from South America.

Valero de Bernabé then joined Simón Bolívar to fight for the independence of the Central and South American colonies from Spain. He also supported the independence of Puerto Rico and Cuba. Like Bolívar, he advocated forming a federation of Latin American nations. After serving as the chief of operations against the faction led by Tadeo Piñago, who was defeated and killed in action, Valero de Bernabé was promoted to brigadier general. He was named general in chief of the armies in the provinces of Aragua, Caracas and Guárico, which involved actions at Boca Chica, Jengibre and San Francisco de Tiznado. Valero de Bernabé led his division in an unsuccessful 1859 revolution organized by Juan Crisóstomo Falcón. From there he migrated to Colombia and reached Bogotá. President Tomás Cipriano de Mosquera named him commander-in-chief of the 1st Division and Military Chief of the State of Boyacá. Valero de Bernabé was both a founding father of Venezuela and of the Federal Party of Venezuela. Falsely accused of plotting against Bolívar, he was sent into exile with his family. When Bolívar died in 1830, Valero de Bernabé was allowed to serve as an honour guard at his funeral. He remained politically active until his own death.

In a career that spanned six decades, taking place in Europe and throughout the Americas, Valero de Bernabé also served in several military and administrative posts. He was the commander-in-chief of the 2nd Division of the Colombian Army that aided Bolívar in Peru. Bolívar named him Military Chief of the Department of the Panama isthmus. Valero was also Chief of Staff of the Colombian Army, Military Commander of Valles de Aragua, Military Governor of Puerto Cabello, Minister of War and Minister of the Navy of Venezuela (under José Tadeo Monagas and José Antonio Páez), Chief of Staff of Mexico, Chief of Operations in the successful campaign against Tamanaco and Güires, and Commander of Arms of the province of Caracas. In addition, Valero de Bernabé received numerous commendations, including the cross of the Independence of Mexico, the Medalla del Libertador, the Medal del Callao, and the Bust of the Liberator of Venezuela.

== Early life ==
=== Lineage ===
Valero de Bernabé was a direct descendant of the Aragonese aristocracy with the recognition of Infanzonería e Hidalguía as a birthright. His titles were traced to May 10, 1372, when Peter IV of Aragon granted the recognitions to Miguel de Bernabé and his siblings and descendants for his actions during the War of the Two Peters, where he died incinerated at the castle of Báguena after refusing to surrender the fortification to the Castilian forces. Numerous descendants of Miguel's were granted other noble titles or married into other aristocratic lineages, becoming counts or marquis. Among them was the inquisitor Pedro de Arbués y Valero, who was canonized by the Catholic Church in 1867. Military tradition was also present and Aurelio Valero de Bernabé would become a Caballero de Malta.

With time, however, the ambiguous language of the recognition led to numerous legal proceedings, which peaked with several taking place before the General Courts in 1678. In response, King Phillip and the Fourth Arm of the General Courts elaborated a Ley y Fuero del Reino establishing that these noble titles were recognized to all descendants of Miguel de Bernabé and his sisters, regardless of the origin of their lineage, and that the descendants of the male members of the family would inherit them. Among the beneficiaries of this infanzería was Juan Valero de Bernabé, father of Antonio Valero de Bernabé Ibañez, who was in turn the great-grandfather of Valero de Bernabé Pacheco.

=== Childhood and military instruction ===
Antonio Vicente Miguel Valero de Bernabé Pacheco was born on October 26, 1790, in the town of Santiago de Fajardo, to Cayetano Valero and Rosa Pacheco de Onormandia. His father was the Subteniente de Ganaderos and Capitain of the Regimiento Fijo of Puerto Rico, following in the military tradition of a family that included his first cousin, the marquis of Cañada and general of the national armies Joaquín Ibáñez de Bernabé. He arrived in Puerto Rico, where he met and married Pacheco, a local noblewoman. On November 14, 1790, Valero de Bernabé was baptized in a ceremony held at the Fajardo parish and headed by presbyter José María Tufiño. His godparents were Miguel Cánovanas and Joaquina Pacheco, with Juan Paulino, José Aguayo and Francisco Bricnony being among the witnesses.

He was born during an age where the absolutist policies of the Spanish Crown had disregarded its colonies, Puerto Rico itself being left without proper education systems, heavily taxed with tributes and lacking formal mercantile relations that allowed them to prosper economically. The power of the local nobility rested in the municipal councils and the cabildos, which were the positions mostly dominated by Puerto Ricans and where the educated gathered. The situation forced the aristocracy to send their children to study abroad, with military education being imparted at the Military Academies of Spain. This led to a military tradition from which figures emerged to prominence in several wars and even the Inquisition, reaching a number of recognitions and titles including caballeros del hábito of various locations.

Fajardo itself was still a small town whose economy mostly revolved around the cattle industry. It had been militarized to combat recurrent attacks by pirates and buccaneers, mainly due to its proximity to Vieques and other adjacent islands, and to prevent the contraband that frequently entered through the coast as a response to the mercantile restrictions imposed by Spain (which led to uncontrolled inflation). In 18th-century Puerto Rico, the local military was composed entirely of nobles, as it was a requisite to hold a position. Valero de Bernabé was raised in Puerto Rico until the age of 13, when his family sent him to Spain. In his Memorias, Valero de Bernabé was critical of the state of local education under the Spanish government, citing that he had been forced by it to leave for Europe. His upbringing left a distinct affection for Puerto Rico, towards which he felt a strong connection despite years of exile.

Once in Spain, Valero de Bernabé opted for a military career and on April 25, 1803, joined the Spanish Army as a cadet. Joining the military academies in Spain at the age of 10 was a privilege reserved for the sons of noble military men. His first martial education was in charge of instructor Jacobo Duxtrax. On November 30, 1804, Valero de Bernabé was promoted to second lieutenant. He joined the Valencia Regiment, where he performed under this rank. On March 20, 1808, Valero de Bernabé was promoted to lieutenant. With the promotion, he was assigned to the Murcia Regiment. When Napoleon Bonaparte refused to leave Spain after being granted access to Portugal through the country, the Peninsular War erupted to protect the independence of the nation. Valero de Bernabé was among those enrolled to battle on behalf of Spain.

== Spanish War of Independence ==
=== Battle of Tudela ===
After losing at the Battle of Bailén, the French were forced to re-organize and take refuge on the left side of the Ebro River. The 5th Central Division, where Valero de Bernabé served, traveled from Tarragona and was taken over by Field Marshall José de Caro at Tudela. They crossed the Ebro several times to reach Funes, from which they were able to discern that the French were organizing to cross the river and reunite at Alfaro. During the night of the 19th they began to move back to Tudela, reaching it two days later, crossing the river one last time and setting camp at the shore guarding a road to Argueda and a bridge. Other forces led by General Castaños (Central) and General Paladox (Right) were also present nearby, leading to a clash between both officers over control of the heterogeneous forces on the night of the 22nd.

Initial orders for the day intended to take control of the area where the road to Alfaro was. However, brigadier and General Mayor of the 5th Cavalry encountered the full force of the 80,000-man French Army led by Moncey, Lannes, Lefevre and Ney during reconnaissance. The Spanish then reorganized to defensive positions, with Valero de Bernabé's division taking the central position while the Castaños led the forces to the left. The French numbers were more than double those of the Spanish side. Hostilities had begun by 8:00 a.m. and the French artillery was proving troublesome to the Spanish to the point that the general ordered his regiment to relocate behind a nearby hill, but their commander was gravely injured and replaced by Sergeant Major Luis María Adriani. The French then redirected their attention to the forces towards the right. Adriani led the regiment to an elevated position, from which he attempted to counter with cannon fire in a strategy that Valero de Bernabé later called "bizarre". In the exchange that followed, he was injured by a rifle bullet in his ankle and was taken away on horseback by a soldier of N. Chacón's escort. The French continued their advance and forced the Spanish to retreat. Valero de Bernabé took note of the amount of dead, wounded and felled animals left behind in the path. In total, the French lost around 6,000 soldiers, while the Spanish side several and had at least 2,000 taken prisoner. In a town en route to Zaragoza, Valero de Bernabé was aided by his cousin Miguel Deso, who gave first aid to treat his wound. Proceeding there, he encountered the chaplain of his regiment, Joaquín Taboada, who had suffered a similar fate. During the night, Valero de Bernabé remained alert to the sound of the distant battles, amidst false alarms.

=== Fight for Zaragoza ===
Valero de Bernabé arrived to Zaragoza at 11 a.m. on the following morning. He immediately took notice of the widespread confusion caused by the influx of numerous wounded, while the townspeople repaired the walls in haste. General Palafox was focused on organizing 35,700 individuals under his command. Within days, Valero de Bernabé began experiencing symptoms of fever, but despite being seriously ill he recovered with the help of Taboada. The chaplain then brought him the notification that his colonel had decided to promote him to the rank of captain on July 24, 1808, due to his actions at Tuleda, also requesting his presence without delay. Rejoiced, a still weak Valero de Bernabé left the house and traveled to the house of his officer, who also paid him two months. After thanking Taboada for notifying him, he left and bought epaulettes at a gambling building, leaving with only five ounces. Afterwards, when he was going to ask Toboada to return since he was felling indisposed, Valero de Bernabé was approached by a colonel that asked if they were related, quickly recognizing the figure as his cousin the marquis of Cañada who greeted him effusively. He informed the officer of his destination and the events that preceded, who responded by noting how he was the mayor general of the group that he had just joined and offered him the role of Adjutant of Orders. Valero de Bernabé accepted the offer and began the following day, seeing it as an opportunity. In the days that followed, he was affected by the death of Toboada as a consequence of his injuries. The Spanish closely monitored the approach of the French, while more work was done to fix the walls. In the meanwhile, they gathered supplies and prepared the organization of the military for the resistance.

During the afternoon of the 20th, the French vanguard was seen doing reconnaissance near the adjacent area of Montetorrero, who led by Marshalls Moncey and Mortier took over the locale within a day. The second led his forces over the Ebeo river and approached the plaza with 10,000 men at 9:00 a.m. attacking the Arrabal, a sector of Zaragoza that is isolated from the rest by the river, an hour later. There Valero de Bernabé was found along the rest if his division, serving under General José de Manzo, guarding it with improvised batteries placed at strategic points to block access. These managed to surprise Mortier's forces, who expected to take the Arrabal without resistance, suffering several casualties at the hand of the Spanish musketeers and artillery. Nonetheless, the French reorganized and launched numerous waves, until their final retreat at 4:00 p.m. when they moved out of range. Valero de Bernabé considered this day a decisive win, nothing that there were French remains scattered throughout the battleground and piled against their defense.

Rumors spread during the days that followed, some citing that either the Duque del Infantado or General Reding would come to help, others that Bonaparte was trapped at the Paular Monastery. Cautious, the town celebrated these by tolling the bells and singing religious songs. As the French exploited these to launch all sort of ammunition, including incendiary bombs and heated cannonballs, Valero de Bernabé suspected that they were responsible for the dubious information. As Zaragosa burned, the lack of food was complicated by the outbreak of an epidemic, killing some of those trapped within and driving others to suicide. The able civilians, both men and women, joined the resistance. Children were also involved in aiding those in the frontline along their mothers. Valero de Bernabé was impressed both by the misery and the heroism that coexisted within the battle.

The French had now sieged Zaragosa for two months, with the resistance frustrating marshal Lannes who wrote to Bonaparte that they were being confronted and attacked by the townspeople who refused to surrender, something that he found disconcerting. The French continued focused on taking control of the area of Arrabal, considered a strategic point. Valero de Bernabé's division was located at the Monjas de Altavoz Convent, where the soldiers sought refuge along the nuns that remained there. Religious buildings, due to their structure and sturdiness, were of strategic advantage. On January 27, the French managed to capture the Monastery of Santa Engracia. Three days later the monasteries of the Greek Augustinians and Santa Mónica also fell, taking more than 70 buildings away from the Spanish resistance. Valero de Bernabé was aided by a nun named Sor Dorotea, who shared her own food with him. She was also responsible for saving his life by moving his bed, concerned that it was adjacent to a cold draft, only for its former location to be bombed shortly afterwards. Valero de Bernabé brushed the incident aside, but the nun was startled and fainted.

The French continued pushing forward, capturing all of the terrain outside the city by early February, systematically breaching Zaragosa as well. The battle, however, was arduous for the emaciated Spanish and was battled in every street and building possible. The French continued exhausting all tactics, including proposing the negotiation of surrender in exchange for concessions, which was sardonically declined by Palafox.

On August 3, the French breached the door to Santa Engracia. Eleven days later, they began a fire that destroyed the convent and allowed them to capture half if Zaragosa. Another attempt at capitulation was met with more cynicism. The population, accepting their death as a likely outcome, sang songs of defiance in favor of dying before surrendering. Both actions impressed Valero de Bernabé. He participated in the attack that took place on December 21, 1808.

=== Decline of Zaragosa ===
By January, the accumulation of dead bodies had become a worse health risk taking the life of José de Manzo (who was replaced by Gaspar de Teballer), with the Spanish using the French prisoners to remove the bodies of their compatriots. Valero de Bernabé was confounded by the choice of hours to exchange fire, which was mostly limited to the night hours. He recorded the actions of a young woman named Agustina Domenech, who took over a post by herself after all men had fallen and manned a cannon against the French. During the attack that took place on January 2, 1809, Valero de Bernabé managed to take over a strategic building and two pieces of artillery.

The remaining survivors of Arrabal were forced to man the batteries without guard changes, due to the losses. Personally, Valero de Bernabé also suffered the loss of Duxtrax, killed in action. During the morning of February 8, the French made a move to take Arrabal, forcing the Spanish to surrender the Convento de Jesús. However, after the military including Valero de Bernabé counterattacked once they breached the adjacent Church, forcing them to retreat after suffering several casualty. His performance at Zaragoza lead to two successive promotions, the first to Lt. Colonel as a direct consequence of this exchange, from which he emerged with an injury in his right leg. His cousin was forced to leave after falling prey to the sickness, with Valero de Bernabé inheriting the responsibilities of the major general. The part proved risky, as he had to travel to the palace where general Palafox was situated adjacent to Arrabal at least twice a day, being exposed. By this point, most of city of Zaragoza had been reduced to rubble, with the remaining population slowly dying to the war or epidemics. The French continued their offensive, incessantly bombing the city and destroying what few buildings were left standing.

=== The fall of the Arrabal ===
The French spent eight days of relative tranquility building new artilleries outside the Arrabal. On February 18, 1809, after deflecting the criticism of Valero de Bernabé and others, a Spanish artillery official tried to ambush enemy troops by throwing a grenade towards them, inadvertently alerting them of the location of his batteries. The French counterattacked with full force, causing significant destruction within two hours. Taking advantage of this, they breached the Arrabal. Sieged by artillery fire, bombs and grenades, Valero de Bernabé's group was forced to leave the San Lázaro battery and retreated towards the square of the Monasterio. The French pushed back the Spanish and killed two generals, including the baron of Visages. Valero de Bernabé was the left in charge of the remaining troops, leading a resistance that was systematically battled on each house and street, but that lost a third of its members overwhelmed by the amount of enemies. This forced them to concentrate on the Tejares battery, their last one left, where the remaining Spanish numbered 1,300 between soldiers and civilians. On the way he met lieutenant Mauricio Alber who noticing that he was only wearing a frock coat gave him an intricate navy uniform. There a reunion was held, where a strategy to move towards the adjacent rural zone of Justibal was discarded due to enemy presence. After seven hours of battle, the group determined that the only option left was to stipulate the condition of the Spanish surrender, which the French opting to ignore capitulations, dividing the captured in groups and stripping them of their weapons and most of their belongings.

Taken prisoner, they were transported to the adjacent Molinos within an hour. The French officers separated their Spanish counterparts and were amused how malnourished men could present resistance. Valero de Bernabé was offered a tobacco by a French officer and requested food. There, he encountered a comrade named José Semanat, with whom he discussed their mutual misery and discussed how he was left broke by losing five ounces of gold, being given half an ounce as a gesture of friendship. During the exchange, he noticed that the silver spurs that he was wearing were still in his feet and hid them. The French generally respected him, since he was still wearing the uniform that he found during the siege, unlike other of the captured. Valero de Bernabé was witness to the systematic burning of what was left of Zaragosa and the purging of those that had remained within, choosing to meditate as a distraction. Afterwards, he was separated from the group and taken towards a dinner prepared by the French officer, who curiously questioned about the Spanish resistance. Valero de Bernabé was given a place to sleep in a building where the French officers were with the protection of this individual, sympathizing with them the loss of comrades. After a sleepless night, he requested to meet the other Spanish officers, who had been taken away, creating anxiety and frustration within him, while wondering why he had been treated differently or why he had not been warned by Semanat. Noticing a grenadier troop assembling behind him, Valero de Bernabé became convinced that he was going to be executed, confronting the enemy officer that had supervised him, only to be told that they had no interest in "executing the brave", citing the extraordinary resistance at Zaragosa, and also critiquing the ambition of his own leaders and the uncritical following that Bonaparte had gained. Surprised by this, he was taken to lunch along the other French officers, where he gave the spurs to the officer as gratitude. The following day he was taken before Lannes, who was amused when Valero de Bernabé requested that his horse was returned.

Capitulations stalled due to an illness suffered by Paralox, with the marshal refusing requests for temporary ceasefire and pressuring by launching more attacks against a reduced population. A Board replaced the ill officer and met with Lannes, who only offered exemptions for women and children, which prompted the Spanish side to insist that it would rather disappear than surrender on his terms. As a witness, Valero de Bernabé noted feeling pride at this stance, particularly due to the circumstances. Lannes in turn offered to give the military an honorable exit from the city. Eventually, capitulations were signed and the French took over Zaragosa, disposing of at least 50,000 bodies.

=== Remainder of the Peninsular War ===
Valero de Bernabé was taken to Pamplona, where he was to be sent to France along other Spanish officers. However, he managed to escape and joined a regiment at Mano de Hierro, being placed under the forces of the Duke of Albuquerque. With them, he participated in the Spanish retreat from Sevilla to León island where the Central Board had been moved. This led to his second promotion, to colonel on March 9, reaching the rank at the age of 19. After three months, he joined the forces of general Senén de Contreras in his mission to aid the town of Tarragona, which was sieged by the French marshal Suchet. Under the general's governance the population there employed similar tactics to Zaragosa, with individuals of all groups resisting, but the city systematically fell into French control who killed him in the process before sacking it. Valero de Bernabé survived this siege and left, joining the Regiment of Chinchilla.

On May 21, 1809, Joaquín Ibañez de Bernabé Cuevas y Grior certified all of the work that Valero de Bernabé had done under his supervision. He remained stationed here for three months. He was awarded the ribbon of the Zaragosa defenders.

In 1810, Valero de Bernabé was sent from the Central Reserve Division of the Army to the Plaza de Cartagena, where he involved in an epidemic while serving in the garrison. In June 18 and 24, 1811, he was involved at actions in Venta del Baúl. On July 21, 1812, Valero de Bernabé and his artillery company entered Ibi, pushing the enemy back to a castle and holding position at the town despite the arrival of reinforcements. Luis María Balanzat later noted in his certification that they remained in their posts despite being early surrounded. Between April 12 and 13, 1813, he fought at Castalla. Valero de Bernabé led the Compañia de Cazadores del Regimiento de Chinchilla and the Division's column on June 13, 1813. He also led his company at the port of Albaida, where they were outnumbered by the enemy. On June 6, 1813, Valero de Bernabé led the retaking of the town of Muro and gained control of other adjacent settlements. From there, he participated in the battle of Castalla under general Roche, who after exchanging control with the French, ordered a retreat when reinforcements led by general Harispe.

Valero de Bernabé was also present in the castle of Sagunto, holding position from January 9 to May 22, 1814, when it was abandoned. The French retreated from Spain shortly afterwards, pursued by the Iberian army.

For his performance in the war, in which he battled for six straight years at several pivotal sites, Valero de Bernabé received the Laureated Cross of San Fernando and was declared Benemérito de la Patria in heroic and eminent grade twice. On March 11, 1815, he was awarded the Cross of Zaragoza in a diploma. At age 26, a copy of his service sheet as a First Adjutant Colonel and the 14th Line of the Expeditionary Battalion in the Infantry Regiment of Sevilla was certified by Lt. Colonel Antonio Muñoz. On March 14, 1816, Valero de Bernabé received the 3rd Army Cross in a diploma. On September 15, 1817, he was also awarded the 2nd Army Cross in a diploma.

=== Masonic rite ===
After the war, he held a debt of gratitude towards Sor Dorotea, whom he was unable to contact or learn of her fate despite making arrangements. Later, he would encounter Agustina Domenech again, now decorated and recognized with the rank of captain.

However, liberals soon grew frustrated with the restored Ferdinand VII, who immediately discarded the proposed 1812 Cádiz Constitution, jailed its proponents and reestablished the Inquisition court. Valero de Bernabé was moved to the guarniciones. Also studying, he became involved with the masonry lodges that were popularized since 1814 and where a number of liberal military-men were discussing how to deal with the absolutists postures of the Crown, conspiring to bring it down and return the Constitution and to stop the assignation of troops to fight in the rebellious American colonies. These grew exponentially, until most of the military was affiliated to them by 1817. General Juan O'Donojú, to whom he served as adjutant, was also a mason. Valero de Bernabé, who was expected to leave and fight against the independence movement at Argentina as adjunct ant of General Dionisio Vives' Buenos Aires battalion, had joined the logia named El Taller Sublime along Antonio Alcalá Galiano. They were sent to Lebrija to wait for transport. Eventually, the conspiracies led to the Grito de Riego, which aborted these plans. In 1819, Enrique O'Donnell, Conde de La Bisbal imprisoned several of the Masonic leaders, including fellow Puerto Rican Demetrio O'Daly and Antonio Quiroga, in a castle. However, sympathizing with the idea of stopping overseas intervention, he allowed them more liberty than expected. A reactionary movement tried to recruit O'Donojú as their main leader, but it was Riego who ultimately took over the revolt. O'Daly and Quiroga escaped and led their respective troops as the insurrection massified. Fearing that he would be executed, Ferdinand relented and gave way to the Constitution. As part of the ensuing reform, the constitutional government named O'Donojú Captain General of Andalusia and Valero de Bernabé accompanied him as adjutant.

Meanwhile, in Mexico Iturbe led its own resistance against Spain, to whom he proposed the Plan de Iguala, which negotiated the establishment of a monarchy with ties to the Spanish Crown. The document was not approved by the Spanish Congress. This led to an increase in revolutionary actions, leading to the destitution of viceroy Apodaca and general Novella being given the authority. However, the Spanish decided to name O'Donojú as the new viceroy, who accepted expecting to negotiate peace in terms similar to the rejected proposals. The functionary left towards Mexico in 1821, and along him traveled Valero de Bernabé.

== Mexican War of Independence ==
=== Joining the revolution; Chief of Staff ===
However, the Mexican revolution was distinctly monarchic and supported by the Church. O'Donojú encountered a situation where the revolt was now the predominant force in the colony, and in which Novella refused to recognize him as viceroy. Eventually, and influenced by the circumstances that had led to the political environment he unsuccessfully tried to calm down the situation, but was met with resistance. Valero de Bernabé was inclined to support the independence cause and communicated this stance to him. While moving towards the capital, O'Donojú's forces were involved in some skirmishes with the revolutionaries and backed away towards Veracruz. He then approached the aristocratic Itúrbide and knowing of his monarchic sentiment, sent Valero de Bernabé and other officers to negotiate a treaty. The pacto de Córdoba was signed on August 24, 1821, proposing an independent monarchy led by the Spanish monarchy, in particular Carlos and Francisco de Paula. However, Ferdinand VII was focused on the Iberian affairs and forged an alliance with Louis XVIII to reverse the liberal constitution, with the Congress taking over the evaluation and eventually voted against and nullified it. O'Donojú was considered a traitor by elements at Spain, facing the criticism of the count of Toreno and representatives of Moscoso and Espiga, while being supported by the Mexican deputies Lucas Alaman, Puchet and Lallave.

Faced with this decision, O'Donojú and his allies defected Spain and traveled to the capital on October 26, a day later Itúrbide entered the city with the rebel army. Both formed the board that ruled immediately afterwards, along Velázquez de León, Bárcenas and Yañez. Itúrbide was placed in charge of the nation, which moved towards an imperial format, and placed in effect a declaration of Independence was drafted on September 28, 1821. Valero de Bernabé addressed his decision to defect Spain and join those that fought to gain their independence from the kingdom citing that "it is very difficult to find a single american of those that served in Europe that had not behaved with honor and decision in defense of Liberty, and while the cause was worthy, the ingrate government never deserved [their] sacrifice." Ultimately, he explained it as a matter of principle, which was enhanced by his birthplace, which beckoned his interests to the New World. He later noted that he "overcame great obstacles and suffered physically for his opinions" as part of his transition. Wanting to reduce the profile of his noble lineage, he began signing his name as simply "Antonio Valero".

The local population was divided between Itúrbide and O'Donojú, a conflict that was solved when the latter died ten days later, officially of pleurisy but with rumors immediately stating that he was poisoned. Valero de Bernabé was given the option to continue his military service for the Mexican army, quickly joining their ranks and being promoted to Chief of Staff of the nation.

=== Plot to assassinate the emperor ===
However, as a Congress was created the first political parties mimicked the conservative and liberal stances of Spain, with conservatives supporting the establishment of a monarchy and liberals lobbying for a republican government. As before, Valero de Bernabé joined the Partido Liberal and faced Itúrbide's Borbonistas and the Ecclesiastic party. The Congress commissioned him to write rules for their Army. Defeated in Congress, their retreated to the Masonic logias under the Scottish rite, with Valero de Bernabé of which he had funded and presiding over one of them. As before, these entities served as the discussion grounds for republican coup d'erat. However, Itúrbide made a move to ascend to the throne on August 10, 1822, aided by a military contingent, clergy and civilians. An extraordinary session was called at Congress, which the liberals boycotted, resulting in his designation as emperor.

Valero de Bernabé was incensed at the move, rejecting the provisions that other officers accepted; the peaceful integration into the new power sphere in exchange for a promotion to the rank of general only. He would preside a session with his masons where he actively plotted to assassin the emperor. Itúrbide opted not to directly attack the logias, concerned with the influence that Valero de Bernabé ejected through them. The empire infiltrated the logias by planting spies within them. Itbúrbide schemed to quell the assassination attempt by making the masonic conspiracies public and immediately promoting Valero de Bernabé to the rank of brigadier general, planting suspicion that he had published the information himself. The plot was successful, forcing Valero de Bernabé to leave the country, after learning that his co-conspirators planned to turn on him and convinced that they would not believe that he was innocent.

He confronted the emperor and requested his passport, revealing that he was aware of the imperial influence among the republicans, and calling Itúrbide a "common tyrant". When responding to the reason why he was leaving, Valero de Bernabé stated that "[Itúrbide] knew [the motive] better than even himself and insisted that he only wanted his passport as "reward" for his services. He then left Veracruz accompanied by another Puerto Rican, a man named Hernáiz who was a Spanish navy lieutenant. They left towards Jamaica, but where intercepted by a corsair near Havana, where they had to disembark. Despite remaining hidden in the Spanish colony, Valero de Bernabé was eventually discovered and imprisoned in a fort. There he rendezvoued with Vives, then governor, who officially ordered his transport to Spain and the issue of a passport for this purpose, but also relaxed the security of the jail. Helped by a group of dissidents, he escaped and managed to travel to board a vapor ship leaving towards New York by using a passport that bore a signature supposed to belong to Vives. From there, he embarked to La Guaira. Due to the nature of this event, its authenticity was questioned until his son, José Valero, certified it during the 20th century.

Afterwards, he would criticize Itúrbide, not only for his imperial ambitions, but also for what he felt were vestiges of "Neron and Caligula", citing a "political and religious Inquisition" that led to the use of deception against the republicans and calling him a hypocrite for allying with the Borbones. Despite the political critic, Valero de Bernabé lamented leaving "a country that owes [him] a few sacrifices for its political existence". On May 1, 1824, Ferdinand VII issued an amnesty decree pardoning those involved in the rebellion, which omitted O'Donojú and his followers, including Valero de Bernabé, who were still threatened with execution if they entered Spanish soil.

== Spanish American wars of independence ==
=== Joining Bolívar; ratification of rank ===
Valero de Bernabé harbored intentions to pursue the independence of the Caribbean colonies, the last bastion of the Spanish in the New World, including his native Puerto Rico and expected to have Bolívar's support once the South American wars were over. After arriving to La Guaira's port, he offered his services to the Colombian army, which were accepted by the vice president, General Santander, who informed him that Bolívar was currently focused on the situation at Peru, where a number of treasons have left him understaffed and suspicious, and that he could not make a compromise on his initiative to pursue the independence of the Antilles at the moment. At Bogota he not only met Santander, but also the general in charge of Simón Bolívar's incursion at Peru, Carlos Soublette. However, a wait of several months that followed until the organization of an army bored him.

Instead of remaining inactive, Valero de Bernabé contacted general Páez on October 20, 1823, who was still battling at Venezuela, offering his services. However, the officer learned that he was being reassigned to take charge of a division at Bogota and declined. On October 28, Valero de Bernabé was formally informed of his post by Colombia's Secretary of Exterior P. Gual. He was given the rank of brigadier general and assigned to serve as commander in chief of the Second Column at Magdalena, from which they were going to Peru to aid Bolívar. Valero de Bernabé found himself in command of unprepared troops, since the bulk of the army was there already.

On November 24, 1823, the delegation of a Cuban independentist group tied to Bernabé Sánchez arrived to La Guaira with intentions of contacting Bolívar, serendipitously staying in the same inn as him. Among them were José Antonio Miralla, Fructuoso del Castillo, José Ramón Betancourt, José Agustín Arango, Gaspar Betancourt Cisneros, and José Aniceto Iznaga. Recognizing common goals, Valero de Bernabé invited them to travel along him to Bogotá, where he was going to meet Santander. The group travelled towards Caracas, where the Cubans met the president of the Colombian Supreme Court Francisco Javier Yáñez, who expressed the same concerns about the timing of the secessionist incursion. Being convinced to postpone the initiative, the group split with Betancourt Cisneros and Ancieto rendezvousing with Valero de Bernabé at Puerto Cabello and reaching Maracaibo on December 14, 1823. From here, they prepared to take the trip to Bogotá on horseback and using canoes, reaching there on January 19, 1824. However, Santader ratified his previous stances on the timing of an independence incursion in the Caribbean.

He travelled to Cartagena, and within months prepared a group of mestizos and amerindians recruited Soledad, Santa Marta and Corozal, for battle. In total, the Second Division was 1,600 strong by the time it left towards Peru, even before it could receive additional members from Zulia, at the behest of general Carlos Soublette. This officer wrote to Valero de Bernabé on August 2, 1824, setting the date of embarkment four days later, time in which he would have to coordinate with other officers. He reunited with Arango, whom he assigned as his private secretary. Valero de Bernabé would traverse the isthmus towards Gatun within days. Santander wrote to Soublette speaking highly of the division, with both officers expressing satisfaction at the improvised group's performance. Valero de Bernabé would remain in communication with the officer, with whom he discussed processal issues and from whom he learned that Itúrbide had been executed.

On February 16, 1824, Valero de Bernabé received a carta de naturaleza from the vice president acting on a law approved on July 4, 1823, with the news making it to the Gaceta de Colombia. Despite this, he faced criticism from the native officers such as general R.M. Carambaño, who insisted that he only took over the Second Division because general Ibarra had been injured in a horse accident. These arguments have been refuted by historians, since Valero actually organized the division and Ibarra was given control of the 1st Division and orders to cross the isthmus after him and aid the injured and ill of the 2nd along the way, having redirected to Caracas before. Ibarra himself expressed respect towards Valero de Bernabé due to his previous experience along O'Donojú, listing him as a "good officer" in a letter to Bolívar.

On August 18, 1824, Soublette wrote to Bolívar about the departure of what he called the "Valero Division", providing a description of its composition and expressed that Valero de Bernabé was "enthusiastic [and] willing to be useful", but also noted some resentment towards him for receiving the rank of brigadier general despite being a recent arrival, but justifying the selection as he had actual military merits as opposed to several Colombian generals which had been promoted as payment due to a lack of funding (a practice that Bolívar described as "stimulating enthusiasm and rewarding feats", despite recognizing that "most [of his generals] only had brutal bravery as a merit" in the Diario de Bucaramanga). The situation was exacerbated when he reached Bogotá and his rank was formally recognized.

During his absence a smear campaign took place in the capital's media, in which a newspaper named El Noticiosito published a piece claiming that "the only service that he had made to Colombia was [being a ventriloquist, one of his hobbies] and publishing some paper [...] that was seen as scientific and eloquent", also implying that he had bought the rank from "some Congress party". Another newspaper titled El Constitucional rebuffed this piece, sardonically congratulated the publication on behalf of him for attacking while he was gone, before turning serious and chastising the editorial line "small and diminute ideas", calling the critics of the government out and challenging them to leave their anonymity and meet with their targets publicly. El Noticiosito published a reply titled Un viudo del Noticiosito al amigo del General Valero y del Señor Miralla, where it argued that he could possess "as much capacity and patriotism as Sieyes and Roger had at France, but that does not justify being placed ahead of the military race, being a foreigner, of other military-men that sealed [the independence] with their blood".

=== Peruvian War of Independence ===
Arriving at Peru, Valero de Bernabé joined forces with the 1st Division under colonel Monagas and 600 men sent by colonel Diego Ibarra. The former was unsatisfied with his new role and was granted a license, being replaced by Rafael Picazo. On October 20, 17 units formed a fleet that took his forces to sea, facing weather conditions that dispersed it. Valero de Bernabé managed to reach the island of Puná on November 14. A day later, he left towards Guayaquil. There he met governor Juan Paz del Castillo and received new directions, momentarily staying there and collaborating with the general while trying to prepare his ailing troops. Valero de Bernabé informed Bolívar of his arrival and received reply from Manuel Jóse Soler to organize and prepare to continue towards Peru. Bolívar and Paz del Castillo exchanged letters on the situation, in which the general stated that Valero de Bernabé "has patience and has worked much", but that he and the troops had fallen ill upon arriving, affecting the composition and conditioning of the soldiers. Regardless of this, Valero de Bernabé took 1,500 infantrymen towards Ayacucho on January 15, 1825.

On February 15, 1825, Valero de Bernabé arrived to Chorrillos. At Perú he faced the distrust of the locals and the independentist officers as a result of the campaign published at Bogotá. Three days later, he arrived to Lima. There, Valero de Bernabé and Arango met with Bolívar and insisted on their plan to lead an incursion to seek the independence of Puerto Rico and Cuba, but received the same response on the timing, followed by an assertion that he did intend to do so in the future, having made a promise to one of his dead colonels. He was given the role of Chief of Staff and received orders to lead the division that was active at the siege of the castle of El Callao under general Bartolomé Salom. In a letter describing the reunion, Bolívar discussed his impression on Valero de Bernabé, stating that he "seems like an excellent officer from what I have seen and heard of him and from his physiognomy".

He placed lines at Bellavista, adjacent to El Callao, preparing to take on the Spanish forces of general Rodil, who stayed within the structure for nearly a year, refusing to surrender despite the army having done so at Ayacucho. However, his relationship with Salom was difficult, with the general often complaining before Bolívar directly and through fellow general Tomás de Heres (who supported his comrade despite admitting in his letter that he had not met Valero de Bernabé), both of which lobbied to have him removed. These conflicts began after Valero de Bernabé founded a Masonic lodge which attracted several officers, despite Salom approaching him and trying to convince him otherwise, considering it a venue for indiscipline and a threat to his authority.

As provisions became scarce, Rodil ordered the expulsion of those that he considered useless to the fight, in particular women. On May 2, Salom ordered his troops not to receive them and to send them back. The following day, Rodil ordered to execute them, with the independentist forces intervening. Valero de Bernabé decided to provide refuge for the group, challenging and questioning Salom's judgement. He commanded some of his soldiers to defend them and facilitate the arrival to Bellavista. Valero then challenged Rodil to a duel, citing a lack of chivalry. This gesture was well received by most of the other officers, including Manuel Figueredo, wrote about the incident in Diario.

Salom and Tomás de Heres insisted on his separation citing increasing insubordination following the act. On May 4, 1825, the second contacted Bolívar reaffirming this posture. Two weeks later, Bolívar ordered Valero de Bernabé to travel towards Colombia, leaving Salom's complaints in charge of Santander. However, Salom withdrew his complaints, minimizing the scope of the matter to a "conflict between two gentlemen" as opposed to widespread insubordination as cited by Tomás de Heres) and instead contacted Bolívar, requesting the stay of Valero de Bernabé until El Callao surrendered. From this point on, his reports were positive.

On January 21, 1826, Santander replied to a letter informing him that Bolívar had not lingering issues with the squabble between the two officers. Valero de Bernabé had originally written requesting assistance for his wife and to discuss his impending award of the Cross of Mexico. Five days later, the capitulation for the surrender of El Callao was signed. On February 15, 1826, Bolívar wrote to Valero de Bernabé congratulating his for the performance at El Callao, citing that he was "very satisfied with his conduct" and offering his recommendation while requesting the reward offered to those involved in the battle.

=== Simulacrums of a Puerto Rican War of Independence ===
After Peru, Bolívar assigned Valero de Bernabé to take a Division towards the isthmus of Panama, expecting an incursion from admiral Laborde. Sucre wrote to Soublette discussing the possibility of joining forces with Valero de Bernabé and begin the emancipation of the Antilles. He arrived during the preparations for the Panama Congress and served as Military Commander and picked the Girardot regiment and reinforcements from Cartagena which were to serve as defense for Portobello. On April 9, 1826, Santander wrote to him a letter informing that he was aware of his work in the department due to reports by general Carreño and that the government was satisfied with his performance. On May 24, 1826, Aniceto reached Bellavista, with the intention of reuniting with Valero de Bernabé and travel to Cartagena and wait in anticipation the beginning of the Caribbean incursion along the Girardot regiment and the reinforcements. On July 9, 1826, Santander congratulated him for the state of the defenses at Portobello, expressing concern about Laborde and discussing the Páez uprising.

The power struggle at Colombia turned several of the officers rebellious, being led by Páez and Santander in separate schemes, convinced Bolívar to leave Peru and reunited with Valero de Bernabé at Panama. One of few to remain loyal, he escorted the leader to Bogotá. In the process, Valero de Bernabé witnessed how the rebels had employed Bolívar's extended absence to turn the Colombian masses against him. The leader was frustrated by what he considered "ingratitude" and faced a similar situation at Venezuela, where he was stripped of all power and recognition. As the Panama Congress begun, Bolívar retreated towards the Quinta de Fusca. Valero de Bernabé passed the 1827 Easter celebration there, and was involved in the preparations to counter a coup d'erat planned at Zipaquisá.

The Congress of Panama approved the resolution to pursue the independence of Puerto Rico and Cuba unanimously, with Bolívar arguing the organization of troops and war ships. However, these plans where used to pressure the end of the war and force Spain to recognize the new nations. Immersed in an internal struggle and receiving demands of the United States not to interfere with their interests at Cuba (and preferring Spanish over British control in the region) and Britain's opposition to intervention because of negotiations to leave the Caribbean alone if Spain recognized the emancipated nations (in turn expecting the United States or France to take over if Spain left the region), the incursion was aborted for the moment.

The Ocaña Convention placed Bolívar and Santander in direct confrontation, with the latter having the majority. The situation failed to reach a consensus and the royalist faction withdrew from the event, effectively marking the dissolution of Gran Colombia into smaller nations. As Bolívar headed towards Bogotá, either to abdicate as president or take the role of dictator depending on the source, he survived an assassination attempt. This led to the execution of several dissidents and the exile of Santander. At Bogotá, Valero de Bernabé served as Subchief of Staff.

On January 25, 1827, after Spain and England entered war, Bolívar began plotting to side with the British and take Puerto Rico along generals Briceño Méndez, Montilla and Padilla. Santander proposed the use of the Girardot battalion in the incursion, knowing Valero de Bernabé's willingness and expecting to easily convince him. However, before the plan came to fruition, Spain and Britain solved their differences diplomatically, with Bolívar opting not to enter into a war without allies. José Valero would later state that his father never stopped thinking about Puerto Rico, and that he persistently held to the idea of its independence.

=== Decline and death of Bolívar; Exile ===
On June 3, 1828, general José La Mar declared war on Colombia and took over Ecuador intending to annex it to Peru. Valero de Bernabé was placed in charge of a division during the counteroffensive, but halted at Popayan, where news broke that La Mar had been defeated by general Flores.

In 1829, Bolívar named Valero de Bernabé Commander of Arms of Puerto Cabello, facing an increasingly secessionist sentiment among Venezuelans. He was charged with dealing with armed revolutionaries at Guines and Pamanco. Valero de Bernabé succeeded in defeating and dissolving both groups. Bolívar, addressing him as a "dear friend of the heart", congratulated him for his success in these missions. After receiving support of the populace and the local government, he opted to stay two months and aid, at the request of general Páez. For this campaign, Valero de Bernabé was named Commander of Arms of Caracas.

Following another uprising led by general Córdova, Bolívar abdicated his title of president of Colombia. In 1830, Páez led a campaign for secession, attacking Bolívar's opposition as the element preventing its completion. This led to demands of exile at the Congress of Valencia. Valero de Bernabé, serving as Minister of War and Navy, protested the treatment being given to Bolívar, being the sole dissident. After the exile demand passed, he rescinded his office and was in turn exiled himself for this stance, settling at St. Thomas. Six months later, Bolívar died at Santa Marta.

== Venezuelan Federal War ==
=== Revolutionary Head of Aragua ===
Valero de Bernabé remained at St. Thomas for a year. Recognizing his military career, the government granted a pension to his family. In 1831, interim Secretary of Interior Antonio Leocadio Gúzman approached him with the intention of having him denounce the exiled Venezuelans. In May, Valero de Bernabé was allowed back into Venezuela. There he revendouzed with Francisco Hernáiz, who extended an invitation on behalf of the government to retake military office. He took the offer, initially remaining distant from the increasingly unstable political landscape. When the liberal and conservative parties were proposed, Valero de Bernabé abandoned this political retirement to join the ranks of the first as one of its founding members.

When general Judas Tadeo Piñango revolted against the government of José Tadeo Monagas, Valero de Bernabé was tasked with opposition the insurrection. He defeated the rebel leader at the Action of Taratara and inflicted wounds that would later prove lethal. For this, Valero de Bernabé was promoted to the rank of divisional general. Under the liberal Monagas, Valero de Bernabé would serve as Commander of Arms of both Caracas and Cumaná and also served as Secretary of War and Navy. He was later assigned Jefe del Ejército del Centro and of the State of Aragua, an office that he held until general Julián Castro led a coup d'erat that placed the conservatives in charge, immediately resigning. From there, he left to his hacienda at Cantón San Sebastián. The new government arrested Valero de Bernabé and transported him to Caracas, but eventually allowed him to leave. He returned to his house at La Victoria.

On July 2, 1858, a federal revolution led by generals Zamora and Juan Crisóstomo Falcón took over the province and named Valero de Bernabé the revolutionary leader for the state of Aragua. He led the organization of enough forces to oppose an incursion by the government, who intended to retake control. At Boca Chica, Valero de Bernabé defeated the centralist forces. However, the federalists faced a counterattack that resulted in losses at Tiznado and Gengibre. As Valero de Bernabé led his forces to join those of Zamora, the general was killed and replaced by a less prepared Falcón. He blamed the loss of the revolution of the tactics employed by this officer, whom he accused of possessing nothing more than "a bravery that could have been imprudent" and of disregarding the preparation of the troops and of failing to keep a proper structure in the General Staff resulting in inefficiency which he tried to compensate by issuing unfair punishment to his officials. As an example of this, Valero de Bernabé cites incidents where Falcón stopped the march of the revolutionary army to "amuse himself by shooting howler monkeys" or set an impromptu fight between two bulls.

=== Exile at Colombia and death ===
After the revolution was forced to retreat, Valero de Bernabé travelled towards Colombia, traversing terrain that lacked infrastructure and transport. On March 28, 1860, he reached Amparo, where he noticed the presence of enemy soldiers guarding the customs building. After Falcón arrived, he spoke to the disgraced leader and opted to cross the river. Valero de Bernabé travelled towards Arauca, but opted not to enter the town due to its reputation as a conservative bastion. On April 7, 1860, they reached El Veneno in Colombia, where they received a cordial welcome. From there, Valero de Bernabé left towards La Pastora, where Ventura Melgarejo offered him lunch to his disdain, having judged the individual a somewhat wealthy figure that exploited this to "enact a despotic authority". His forces managed to cross the Ele river with the help of the local natives, towards El Trompito. They then crossed the Bravo river, guarding against other tribes. On the other side, they gave some tobacco to the natives and set camp, wary that their horses could be stolen by them. While getting ready to continue the march, Valero de Bernabé noticed that part of his entourage had left during the night, opting to follow the tracks left by a bull. On April 12, 1860, they arrived at Betoye, where they encountered some comrades and where they rested at a mansion. The following day, Valero de Bernabé received a mare from colonel Eulogio Aranguren and rendezvoused with Falcón. Marching towards Casenare, they reached Moreno four days later, where he reunited with Falcón again. Valero de Bernabé remained there until May 9, 1860, reaching Meseta the following day. Traveling the following morning, his mare slipped from a slope and both fell, forcing him to continue on foot. Arriving at Labranza Grande, Valero de Bernabé traded the injured animal for another, continuing and making brief stops at Venta de Caicus. On May 17, 1860, they crossed the Páramode San Ignacio and arrived at Mongua, where Valero de Bernabé visited the Church and was amused after recognizing the work of Rousseau, D'Alambert and Voltaire among the priest's collection. The following day they arrived to the liberal bastion of Sogamoso, where he stayed until May 30, later commenting favorably about his time there. Valero de Bernabé was joined by colonel Ferrero and commander Santos Mattey, who escorted him towards Tunja, where he met with the president of the state, the general commander and a doctor who had a daughter of the same age as Rosa, which made him feel homesick, opting to attend a mass at a convent and pray for the safety of his family at Venezuela. A dance was held in his honor, being attended by the local nobility. On June 3, 1860, they left towards Venta Quemada, from where they travelled to Venta del Sopé, their last stop before reaching the capital. At Bogotá Valero de Bernabé rented a house, where he was visited by Fructuoso del Castillo (now a commander in the Colombian military), general Pablo Durán who had received his aid as governor after being jailed in 1829, and several of his colleagues. Valero de Bernabé later commented how the local aristocracy welcomed him, receiving visits from a host of people including the chief of business of Peru, Colonel Francisco Selaya, the family of general Codazi and Elvira de Yuleta, to whom he had served as marriage godfather. However, he took notice that the city's location represented a challenge to its development. On July 21, 1860, Valero de Bernabé left Bogotá, intending to move closer to his family. As he passed to the Quinta de Fusca on his way to Cúcuta, he rememorated about his time with Bolívar. Arriving at his destination, he reunited with Hernáiz, from whom he received a letter from his wife. Valero de Bernabé also received a letter for general Andrade, which negotiated safe passage for himself in Venezuelan territory. However, the reunions that followed failed to produce results, as the officer refused to take authority on the matter. From there he wrote on the return of Páez, Angel Quintero and the failed peace talks that followed.

Valero de Bernabé received limited safe passage from the governor of Cúcuta, Ramón Palenzuela, allowing him to travel to the house at Táchira. There he wrote to Páez about his desire to reunite with his family in Caracas, for which he received no reply. However, his daughter Manuela warned him not to risk the journey, since he had been denied passport. Governor Bracho informed him that orders were issued for his exile and proposed a declaration of loyalty to Páez and a compromise not to become involved in the re-emergent revolution, but Valero de Bernabé refused to do it, considering such a gesture "servile". Instead, he traveled to Maracaibo and stayed at the house of general Urdaneta. Valero de Bernabé remained critical of Páez, whom he regarded as "the primordial cause of all revolutions [and] the biggest hindrance [towards] prosperity" and a "hypocritical [and ambitious] tyrant", and his politics, growing convinced that his moderation while exiled had been a farce. When news were made that Páez and several functionaries were arriving to Maracaibo, he expressed disdain. Travelling towards Cúcuta, Valero de Bernabé learned that the liberals had taken Bogotá and that they had established the right for wage and pension to the military involved in the independence wars. He offered his services to the authorities and received a passport honoring his rank that allowed his travel to the capital. On the way he stopped in the conservative town of Málaga, where he was received by president Salgar, which whom he had no issues despite the difference in criteria. From there he travelled towards Socorro, arriving to Chiquinquisá 14 days later after traversing rough terrain. After arriving to Bogotá, Valero de Bernabé stayed at the Tequendama Hotel, where he met Antonio Leocadio Gúzman and Nicholas Quevedo, later visiting general Mosquera who accepted reincorporating him into the Colombian military symbolized by the award of a uniform, silk belt sword and a coat. He was also given means to make sure that 100 pesos from his earnings were sent to his family. While traveling to Tunja, Valero de Bernabé received instructions from the president to return to Bogotá and leaving him in charge of the city in case of conflict. He received the support of Mosquera during his tenure, eventually retiring at the age of 72.

In April 1863, the Federal War concluded with the federalists victorious. Valero de Bernabé died on June 7, 1863, at 11:00 p.m. unable to reunite with his family at Venezuela. The following day he received obsequies with full military honors. On June 9, 1863, Valero de Bernabé was laid to rest in a local cemetery. Afterwards, his family remained at Venezuela. With time the exact location of his body was lost, due to lack of maintenance and his figure fell out of the Colombian traditions. General Gúzman Blanco later ordered for his body to be relocated to the National Pantheon, but was unable to do so, unable to locate his body.

== Personal life ==
Valero de Bernabé was describe as educated, "of Byronian type" and "possessor of an exquisite culture". Valero de Bernabé's aristocratic lexicon, tendency to wear clean uniforms and his customs involving mannerisms and chivalry contrasted with the less formal behavior of both Bolívar and the other officers, something that worked in his favor at Lima making him popular among the women. Palma notes that at the age of 37, he was considered "the perfect type of chivalrous ladies man". Tovar also addressed this description, citing an "elegant figure, well modulated voice [and] singular people skills", noting that he "was gentle even with the miserable" and "pleasant to talk".

Valero de Bernabé was a ventriloquist. Palma wrote about this skill in El Fraile y la Monja del Callao and Un ventrílocuo. In the first, the author narrates an incident where Valero de Bernabé was surrounded in an alley while returning to Bellavista, concealing himself and used his skill to project revolutionary cries as if they were coming from the rifles of the royalist, who were shocked and dropped the weapons, believing that they had become possessed by a demon, before running away to his amusement.

General Luis Capella Toledo also wrote about the skill in La Serrana de Anco citing an episode where a family from Anco reached Valero de Bernabé's camp at Bellavista, who escorted them back there and projected his voice upon the forage to convince their daughter to return with her fiancé there. He would also employ this skill to play pranks, as he did when he tricked general Santa Cruz into thinking that a shrimp was begging not to be eaten, convinced a merchant that chicks had were complaining from within freshly laid eggs and chastised a herbalist for hitting his donkey by tricking him into believing that the animal warned him about vengeance. Despite being mischievous, Valero de Bernabé usually explained his ability to those that he fooled.

Tovar describes his ideas as "liberal" and "radical" about his definition of the concept of liberty, which the author states he was capable of disseminating "eloquently", something that earned him a following at Lima. He also describes him as "brace and experienced in the art of war" and states that he displayed "military cleverness in several attacks" during his presence at Peru. In reference to the incident where Rodil ordered the execution of those he regarded as useless, he classifies it as an example of "observative character, humanitarian sentiment and spirituality".

When discussing his opposition to the Utúrbide and to Bolívar's exile, Venezuelan Vicente Dávila considers that this is a recurring personality trait of Valero de Bernabé, assuming that it emanated from "his republican principles". He considered the latter event a "ring of glory in his service record, which now exhibits its dues with pride." Valero de Bernabé was critical of the recurrent civil wars taking place at the emancipated Latin American nations, calling them "a cancer" that prevented "systems of democratic governments [from ever reaching] perfection", in the process causing a malady of sociocultural issues.

== Legacy ==
In life, Valero de Bernabé established logias at Mexico and Peru. Valero de Bernabé's Memorias provided perspectives of several military incursions that were different from those compiled by early 20th Century scholars. This work was compiled in several books, some of which were lost or damaged by the passage of time, and written in a sober tone that avoided self-aggrandizement. His account of the battle at Tuleda is one of few where the entire chronology of the event is covered, and possibly the only one during this timeframe. Likewise, his firsthand account of the battle at Zaragosa, which remained unedited for 70 years, contrasted with the historian works that at the time depended mostly of pastiches of several sources. The passport bearing the counterfeit signature of Vives, and the real counterpart, were preserved by his family.

In 1874, the Venezuelan government built a National Pantheon of the Founding Fathers where the remains of their heroes were to be placed. Valero de Bernabé's name is inscribed on the monument but his remains, which were never located, were not placed at the site. Puerto Rico has also honored Valero de Bernabé's memory by naming a school and an avenue after him. There is also a statue of Valero de Bernabé in the city of Fajardo, his native city.

During the 1920s, his son José Valero Lara collaborated in retrieving several documents from the National Archive at Caracas and publications provided by archivist Vicente Dávila, in particular the book Investigaciones históricas, allowing for a biographical work to be published by Mariano Abril.

His direct arrival to Peru from Mexico led to some confusion among Peruvian historians about his actual origin, including Enrique C. Tovar, who published a panflet that was credited as popularizing his figure beyond the academic circles. In it, this author describes Valero de Bernabé as possessing "strong influence among the troops", describing that the "Valero battery" had been among the most efficient against Rodil. The author also argued that he could be considered a "libertador of both Spains".

By the 1970s, this misconception had been repeated in the Diccionario hispano-americano. Eduardo Posada, former Secretary of National Historic Academy of Colombia considered Valero de Bernabé a prócer (a Spanish term akin to "national hero"), lamenting that his name had not been as remembered as those of other "noble and disinterested men [that reached Colombia] during the heroic days of Independence". Writing about the siege of El Callao, Peruvian Ricardo Palma wrote that he "was worth for his intelligence, courage, activity and preparation almost as much as an army", describing him as an "unleashed lion" in the battlefield.

== See also ==
- List of Puerto Ricans
- List of Puerto Rican military personnel
- Simón Bolívar
- Agustín de Iturbide
- María de las Mercedes Barbudo
- Ducoudray Holstein Expedition
