= María de las Mercedes Barbudo =

Puerto Rican activist

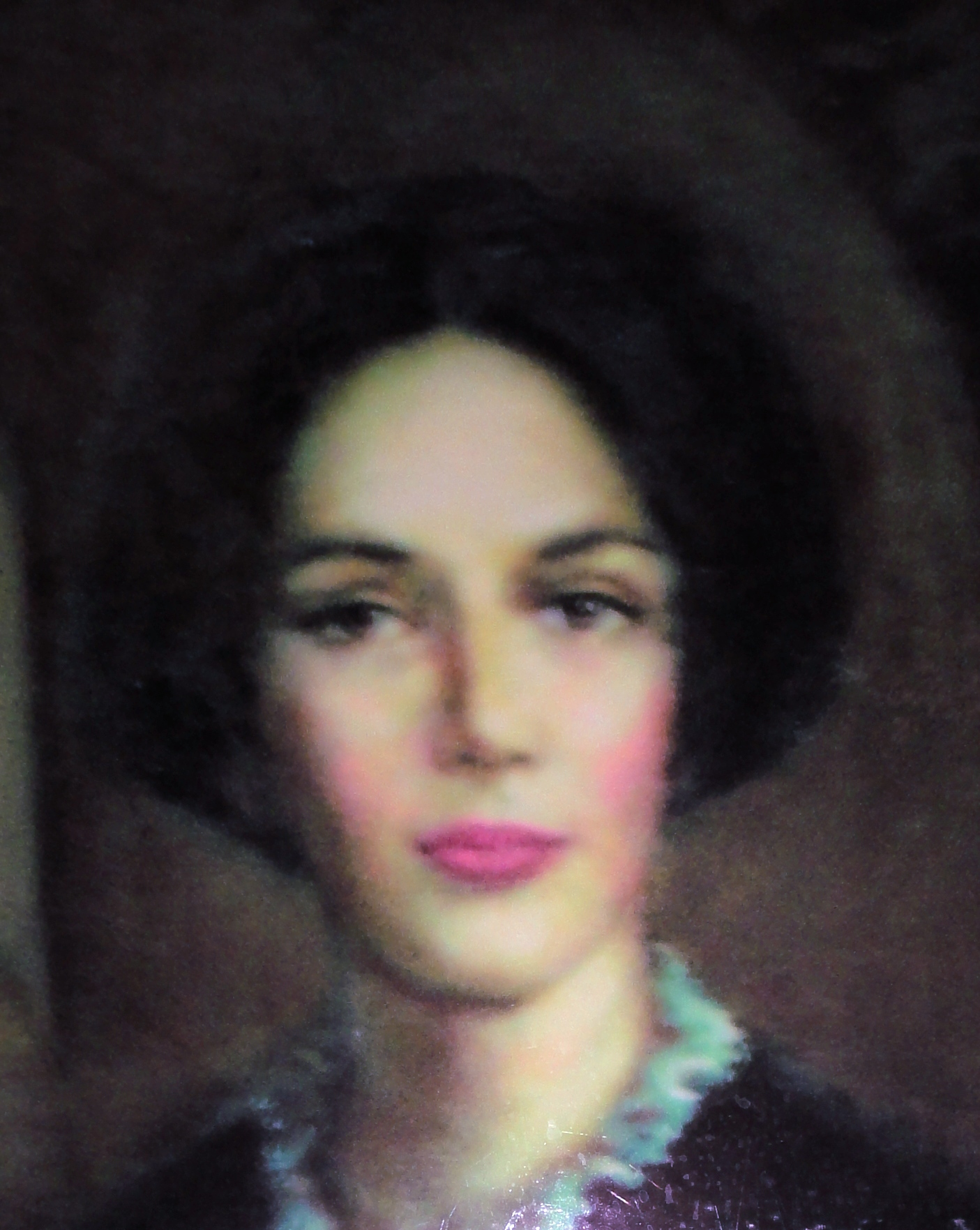
- Born: 1773; San Juan, Puerto Rico
- Died: February 17, 1849 (aged 76); Caracas, Venezuela
- Movement: Puerto Rican independence movement

María de las Mercedes Barbudo (1773 – February 17, 1849) was a Puerto Rican political activist, the first woman Independentista in the island, and a "Freedom Fighter". At the time, the Puerto Rican independence movement had ties with the Venezuelan rebels led by Simón Bolívar.

== Early years ==
María de las Mercedes Barbudo y Coronado was one of four siblings born in San Juan, the capital of Puerto Rico, to a Spanish father, Domingo Barbudo, and Puerto Rican mother, Belén Coronado. Her father was an officer in the Spanish Army. The benefits of being the daughter of a military officer was that she could afford to obtain an education and to buy books. She was one of the few women in the island who learned to read because at the time, the only people who had access to libraries and who could afford books were either appointed Spanish government officials or wealthy landowners. The poor depended on oral story telling, in what are traditionally known in Puerto Rico as Coplas and Décimas. Well educated, Barbudo became interested in politics and social activism.

== Political activist ==
As a young woman, Barbudo founded a sewing goods store in San Juan, specialising in the sale of buttons, threads and clothes. She eventually became successful as a personal loan provider. She dealt commercially with Joaquín Power y Morgan, an immigrant who came to Puerto Rico as a representative of the Compañía de Asiento de Negros, which regulated the slave trade on the island.

Barbudo moved in prominent circles, which included notable citizens such as Captain Ramón Power y Giralt (Joaquín's son), Bishop Juan Alejo de Arizmendi and the artist José Campeche. She had a liberal mind and as such would often hold meetings with intellectuals in her house. They discussed the political, social and economic situation of Puerto Rico and the Spanish Empire in general, and proposed solutions to improve the well-being of the people.

Simón Bolívar and Brigadier General Antonio Valero de Bernabé, known as "The Liberator from Puerto Rico", dreamed of creating a unified Latin America, including Puerto Rico and Cuba. Barbudo was inspired by Bolívar; she supported the idea of independence for the island and learned that Bolívar hoped to establish an American-style federation among all the newly independent republics of Latin America. He also wanted to promote individual rights. She befriended and wrote to many Venezuelan revolutionists, among them José María Rojas, with whom she regularly corresponded. She also received magazines and newspapers from Venezuela which upheld the ideals of Bolívar.

== Held without bail or trial ==
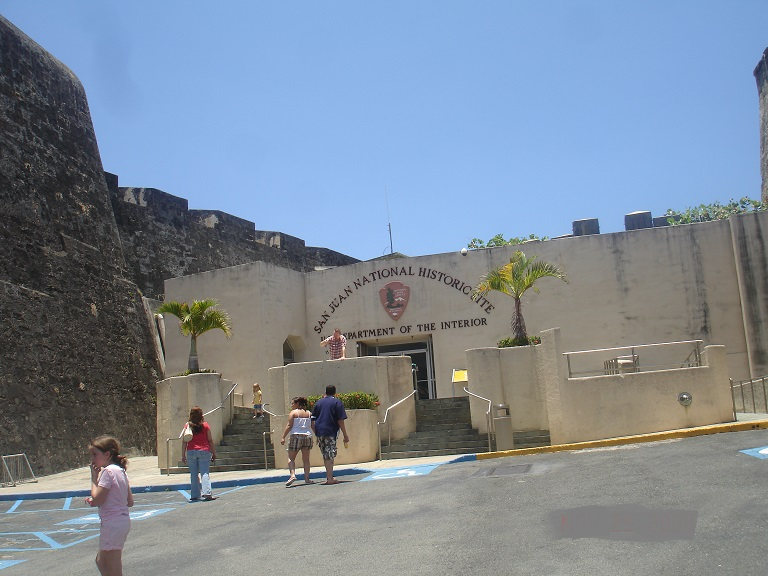
San Juan National Historic Site "Castillo (Fort) de San Cristóbal"

The Spanish authorities in Puerto Rico under Governor Miguel de la Torre were suspicious of the correspondence between Barbudo and the Venezuelan rebel factions. Secret agents of the Spanish Government intercepted some of her mail, delivering it to Governor de la Torre. He ordered an investigation and had her mail confiscated. The Government believed that the correspondence served as propaganda of the Bolívarian ideals and that it would also serve to motivate Puerto Ricans to seek their independence.

Governor Miguel de la Torre ordered her arrest on the charge that she planned to overthrow the Spanish Government in Puerto Rico. Barbudo was held without bail at the Castillo (Fort) de San Cristóbal, since the island did not have a prison for women. Among the evidence which the Spanish authorities presented against her was a letter dated October 1, 1824, from Rojas in which he told her that the Venezuelan rebels had lost their principal contact with the Puerto Rican independence movement in the Danish island of Saint Thomas and therefore the secret communication which existed between the Venezuelan rebels and the leaders of the Puerto Rican independence movement was in danger of being discovered.

On October 22, 1824, Barbudo appeared at a hearing before a magistrate. The Government presented as evidence against her various letters which included five letters from Rojas, two issues of the newspaper El Observador Caraqueño; two copies of the newspaper El Cometa, and one copy each of the newspapers El Constitucional Caraqueño and El Colombiano, which were sympathetic to Bolívar's ideals. When asked if she recognized the correspondence, she answered in the affirmative and refused to answer any more questions. The government also presented as evidence various anti-monarchy propaganda pamphlets to be distributed throughout the island. Barbudo was found guilty.

== Exile and escape to Venezuela ==
Governor de la Torre consulted with the prosecutor Francisco Marcos Santaella as to what should be done with Barbudo. Santaella suggested that she be exiled from Puerto Rico and sent to Cuba. On October 23, 1824, de la Torre ordered that Barbudo be held under house arrest at the Castillo de San Cristóbal under the custody of Captain Pedro de Loyzaga. The following day Barbudo wrote to the governor, asking to be able to arrange her financial and her personal obligations before being exiled to Cuba. The Governor denied her request and on October 28 she was placed aboard the ship El Marinero.

In Cuba, she was held in an institution in which women accused of various crimes were housed. With the help of revolutionary factions, Barbudo escaped and went to Saint Thomas Island. She eventually arrived at La Guaira in Venezuela where her friend José María Rojas met her. They went to Caracas where she met Bolívar. Barbudo established a close relationship with the members of Bolívar's cabinet which included José María Vargas. He later was elected as the fourth president of Venezuela. She worked closely with the cabinet.

== Legacy and honors ==
Barbudo never married nor had any children and did not return to Puerto Rico. She died on February 17, 1849. She was buried in the Cathedral of Caracas next to Simón Bolívar. Interment in the cathedral was an honor usually reserved only for the church hierarchy and the very rich.

In 1996, a documentary was made about her titled Camino sin retorno, el destierro de María de las Mercedes Barbudo (Road of no return, the exile of María de las Mercedes Barbudo). It was produced and directed by Sonia Fritz.

== See also ==
- List of Puerto Ricans
- History of women in Puerto Rico
- Antonio Valero de Bernabé
- Ducoudray Holstein Expedition

19th Century female leaders of the Puerto Rican Independence Movement

- Lola Rodríguez de Tió
- Mariana Bracetti

Female members of the Puerto Rican Nationalist Party

- Blanca Canales
- Rosa Collazo
- Lolita Lebrón
- Ruth Mary Reynolds
- Isabel Rosado
- Isabel Freire de Matos
- Isolina Rondón
- Olga Viscal Garriga

Articles related to the Puerto Rican Independence Movement

- Puerto Rican Nationalist Party Revolts of the 1950s
- Puerto Rican Nationalist Party
- Ponce massacre
- Río Piedras massacre
- Puerto Rican Independence Party
- Grito de Lares
- Intentona de Yauco
- Ruben Berrios
- Maria de Lourdes Santiago
