= Rosa Collazo =

Puerto Rican nationalist (1904–1988)

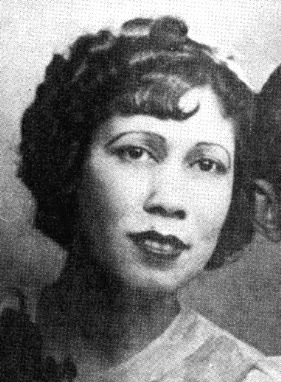
- Collazo in 1950
- Born: Rosa Cortez Fernández; 1904; Mayagüez, Puerto Rico
- Died: May 1988 (aged 83–84); San Juan, Puerto Rico
- Political party: Puerto Rican Nationalist Party
- Movement: Puerto Rican Independence

Rosa Collazo a.k.a. Rosa Cortez-Collazo (Note: This name uses Spanish marriage naming customs; the first is the maiden family name " Cortez " and the second or matrimonial family name is " Collazo ".) (1904 – May 1988) was a political activist and treasurer of the New York City branch of the Puerto Rican Nationalist Party. She was the wife of Oscar Collazo one of two Nationalists who attacked Blair House in 1950 in an attempt to kill President Harry Truman. She was accused by the FBI of assisting Nationalists Lolita Lebrón, Rafael Cancel Miranda, Irvin Flores and Andres Figueroa Cordero in their assault on the United States House of Representatives in 1954. She was charged on both occasions with seditious conspiracy for her complicity in a conspiracy to overthrow the United States Government and imprisoned because of her political beliefs.

== Early years ==
Cortez-Collazo (birth name: Rosa Cortez Fernández) was born in the City of Mayagüez in Puerto Rico to Ramon Cortez, a merchant marine and Juana E. Fernandez, a seamstress. At a young age she moved to the City of Ponce where she was raised by her father's family after her parents were divorced. There she received her primary and secondary education. She graduated from Ponce High School in 1923 and completed a 6-week nurses' aide course. Cortez-Collazo decided that being a nurses' aide was not her calling after she had to deal with the corpse of a suicide victim.

In 1925, when she was 21 years old, she moved to New York City and lived with her father who had moved there two years earlier. There she worked for a hat company but, barely survived with the income that she received. She rented a room from her godmother who lived in an apartment building in Manhattan. Cortez-Collazo was subject to the racism which was rampant at the time in the United States.

Cortez-Collazo became politically active and joined the Caborrojeño Club and later joined the Club Obrero Español, radical labor oriented organization. She survived, during the great depression of the 1930s, with the help of the Salvation Army. During this period in her life she met and married Justo Mercado with whom she had two daughters, Iris and Lydia. She eventually divorced her husband.

== Puerto Rican Nationalist Party ==
The Puerto Rican Nationalist Party was founded by José Coll y Cuchí as a direct response to the American colonial government in 1919, By the 1920s, there were two other pro-independence organizations in the Island, they were the "Nationalist Youth" and the "Independence Association of Puerto Rico". On September 17, 1922, the two political organizations merged into the Puerto Rican Nationalist Party. In 1924, Dr. Pedro Albizu Campos joined the party and on May 11, 1930, Dr. Pedro Albizu Campos was elected president of the Puerto Rican Nationalist Party.

On March 21, 1937, there was a peaceful civilian march that took place on Palm Sunday in Ponce, Puerto Rico. The police began shooting their firearms at those present and 19 civilians and two policemen were killed, The shootings by the police became known as the Ponce massacre. This event influenced her nationalistic views even further and she joined the New York cell of the Nationalist Party in 1937.

== Oscar Collazo ==
In 1941, Oscar Collazo moved to New York City, which at the time had a large Puerto Rican community. There he met and married Rosa Cortez. The couple lived in an apartment building in the Bronx. They had a total of three daughters from previous marriages: Rosa had two and Oscar had one.

Oscar, who worked in a metal polishing factory, joined the New York branch of the Puerto Rican Nationalist Party. He met and became friends with Albizu Campos when the latter was hospitalized for a time at the Columbus Hospital. Oscar was named Secretary of the New York branch of the Puerto Rican Nationalist Party and later served as its president. He met Griselio Torresola, a fellow nationalist, in New York and the two men soon became friends.

=== Plot to assassinate President Truman ===
On October 30, 1950, Torresola and Oscar learned that the Jayuya Uprising in Puerto Rico, led by the nationalist leader Blanca Canales, had failed. Torresola's sister had been wounded and his brother Elio was arrested. Believing they had to do something for their cause, Oscar and Torresola decided to assassinate President Harry S. Truman, in order to bring world attention to the need for independence in Puerto Rico.

External audio
- Newsreel scenes in English of the assassination attempt on U.S. President Harry S Truman on YouTube

On October 31, 1950, Oscar and Torresola arrived at Union Station in Washington, D.C., and registered in the Harris Hotel. On November 1, 1950, with guns in hand, they attempted to enter the Blair House, where the President was living during renovation of the White House. During the attack, Torresola mortally wounded White House Police officer, Private Leslie Coffelt. Oscar wounded another man. After wounding others, Torresola was killed by the mortally wounded Coffelt. Oscar was shot in the chest and arrested. In 1952, Oscar was convicted and sentenced to death and was sent to the federal prison at Leavenworth, Kansas.

According to Cortez-Collazo the FBI knocked on her door and more than twenty agents entered. They showed her a photo of Oscar on the ground and told her that they had just killed him, she then replied:

"If he died, he died for the causeI!"

Cortez-Collazo was accused of collaboration to overthrow the government and was sent to the Women's House of Detention on Greenwich Street in Lower Manhattan where she spent 8 months imprisoned. Upon her release, she successfully campaigned on her husband's behalf and gathered thousands of signatures demanding that his sentence be commuted to life. President Truman commuted his sentence to life imprisonment to be carried out at Leavenworth. She also worked (unsuccessfully) for the release of her cellmate Ethel Rosenberg.

== Planning the assault on the House of Representatives ==
In 1954, Lebrón received a letter from Albizu Campos, in which he declared his intention to order attacks on "three locations, the most strategic to the enemy". Albizu Campos wanted Lebrón to pick a group of nationalists for this task without her personal participation. Lebrón presented the plan to the Nationalist Party in New York where Cortez-Collazo served as treasurer. Lebrón choose Rafael Cancel Miranda, Irvin Flores and Andrés Figueroa Cordero for the task. The pistols used in the attack were purchased by the Chicago Nationalist branch and sent to the New York branch. The New York branch provided the group with weapons and the funds for their railroad tickets.

Disregarding Albizu Campo's wishes, she decided to lead the group. The date for the attack on the House of Representatives was to be March 1, 1954. This date was chosen because it coincided with the inauguration of the Conferencia Interamericana (Interamerican Conference) in Caracas. Lebrón intended to call attention to Puerto Rico's independence cause, particularly among the Latin American countries participating in the conference.

=== Assault on the House of Representatives ===
External videos
- Newsreel scenes in English of the attack on the U.S. Capitol by Flores, Lebrón, Cancel Miranda and Figueroa Cordero

The Nationalists arrived with the group in Washington, D.C., and sat in the visitor's gallery in the House of Representatives. The representatives of the House were discussing Mexico's economy when suddenly Lebrón gave the order to the group to quickly recited the Lord's Prayer. She then stood up and shouted "¡Viva Puerto Rico Libre!" ("Long live a Free Puerto Rico!") and unfurled the flag of Puerto Rico. The group opened fire with semi-automatic pistols. Even though some 30 shots were fired (mostly by Cancel, according to his account), wounding five lawmakers; one representative, Alvin Morell Bentley from Michigan, was seriously wounded in the chest, Figueroa Cordero was unable to fire his gun because it was jammed. Upon being arrested, Lebrón yelled:

"I did not come to kill anyone, I came to die for Puerto Rico!"

== Arrest and trial ==
Lebrón, Cancel Miranda and Figueroa Cordero were immediately arrested. However, Flores walked away from the building in the confusion that followed. He took a taxi to a bus stop. There he was stopped and questioned together with various Mexicans who happened to be there, by the local police who had just heard about the shooting. They found a loose bullet in his pocket and arrested him.

The members of the New York City branch of the Puerto Rican Nationalist Party, including Cortez-Collazo, were also arrested. On July 13, 1954, the Nationalists were taken to New York, where they declared themselves not guilty on the charges of "trying to overthrow the government of the United States". She was accused of being the Liaison between party leaders in Puerto Rio and the New York junta; treasurer of the New York junta and participant in its discussions in regard to the House of Representative shootings. On October 26, 1954, judge Lawrence E. Walsh found all of the accused guilty of conspiracy and they were sentenced to various years in prison. She was committed for seven years at Alderson Prison, West Virginia. There she continued her friendship with fellow inmates Lolita Lebrón and Blanca Canales. She vowed:

" No one will ever pull me out of the struggle!" "For this I want to live until we are free."

== Post imprisonment ==
Cortez-Collazo was released from prison in 1961 and visited her mother in Puerto Rico. She later returned to her apartment in the Bronx. In 1968, she moved to Puerto Rico with her daughter Lydia and grandson. They purchased a house in Levittown, an area which is a suburb of the municipality of Toa Baja. In 1977, she joined the campaign to free the Nationalists held in the U.S. federal prisons.

On September 6, 1979, President Jimmy Carter commuted her husband's sentence to time served, after Oscar had spent 29 years in jail. President Carter also commuted the sentences of Oscar's fellow Nationalist comrades: Irvin Flores, Rafael Cancel Miranda, and Lolita Lebrón. Andrés Figueroa Cordero had been released from prison earlier because of health issues related to his terminal cancer. Oscar had been eligible for parole since April 1966, however, he had not applied for a parole because of his political beliefs. Cortez-Collazo flew to Kansas City to greet her husband. Upon their return to Puerto Rico, the Nationalist activists were received as heroes by the different independence groups.

The Governor of Puerto Rico Carlos Romero Barceló publicly opposed the pardons granted by Carter, stating that it would encourage terrorism and undermine public safety. The twenty-nine years of separation eroded the marriage of the Collazo's and they ended up divorced.

== Later years and legacy ==
She continued to actively participate in Puerto Rico's independence movement. In 1984 a commemoration for her independence activities was held in the Bar Association Building. She was also given recognition for her efforts towards the commutation of her ex-husband's death sentence.

She wrote her life story which is titled Memorias de Rosa Collazo, ASIN: B0000D6RNT. The book was published posthumously on January 1, 1993, by her daughter Lydia Collazo Cortez. In May 1988, Cortez-Collazo died in San Juan, Puerto Rico by the side of her daughter Lydia, with whom she had been living the last years of her life.

A plaque at the monument to the Jayuya Uprising participants in Mayagüez, Puerto Rico, honors the women of the Puerto Rican Nationalist Party. Rosa Cortez-Collazo's name is on the ninth line of the third plate.

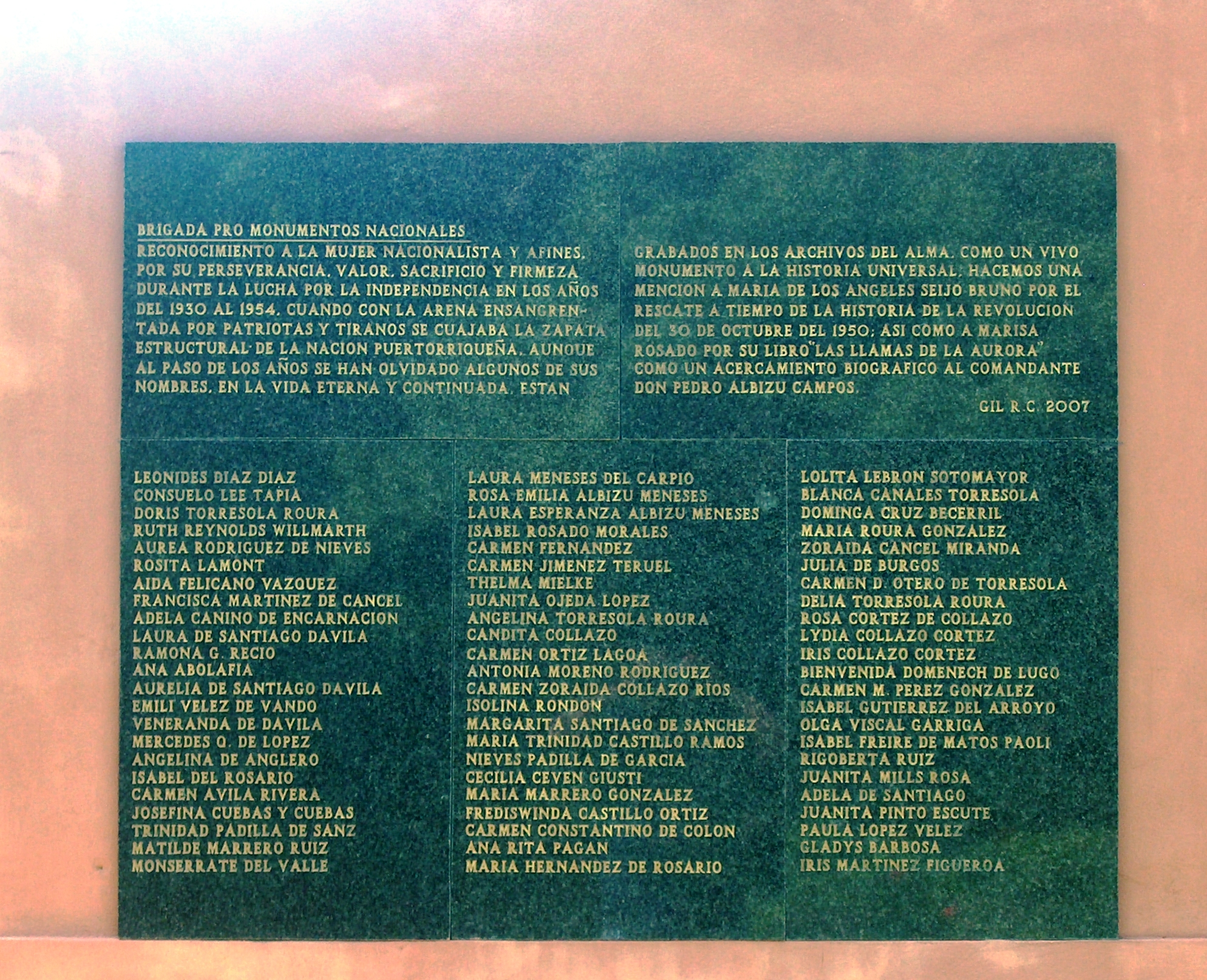
Plaque honoring the women of the Puerto Rican Nationalist Party

Oscar Collazo continued to participate in activities related to the independence movement. On February 21, 1994, he died of a stroke.

== See also ==
- List of Puerto Ricans
- Boricua Popular Army
- Fuerzas Armadas de Liberación Nacional (Puerto Rico)
- History of women in Puerto Rico

19th-century female leaders of the Puerto Rican Independence Movement

- María de las Mercedes Barbudo
- Lola Rodríguez de Tió
- Mariana Bracetti

Female members of the Puerto Rican Nationalist Party

- Julia de Burgos
- Lolita Lebrón
- Ruth Mary Reynolds
- Isabel Rosado
- Isabel Freire de Matos
- Isolina Rondón
- Olga Viscal Garriga
