= Ruth Mary Reynolds =

Puerto Rican educator and independence advocate

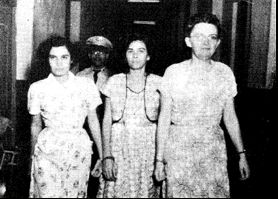
- The arrest of Nationalists (L to R); Carmen María Pérez Gonzalez, Olga Viscal Garriga and Ruth Mary Reynolds.
- Born: February 29, 1916; Terraville, Lawrence County, South Dakota
- Died: December 2, 1989 (aged 73); South Dakota
- Political party: Puerto Rican Nationalist Party
- Movement: Puerto Rican Independence

Ruth Mary Reynolds (February 29, 1916 – December 2, 1989) was an American educator, political and civil rights activist who embraced the ideals of the Puerto Rican Nationalist Party. She was incarcerated in La Princesa Prison for sedition during the Puerto Rican Nationalist Party Revolts of the 1950s. As one of the founders of the organization known as the "American League for Puerto Rico's Independence," she devoted many years of her life to the cause of Puerto Rico's independence from the United States after her release from prison.

== Early years ==
Reynolds was born in 1916 in Terraville, Lawrence County, South Dakota, a mining town in the Black Hills. As a young woman, she taught high school for two years, including one year of teaching on an Indian reservation. After earning a Master's degree from Northwestern University, she relocated to New York City, where she joined the Harlem Ashram, an interracial pacifist community dedicated to the development of non-violent strategies for social change.

== Harlem Ashram ==
The Ashram was founded by Ralph Templin and Jay Holmes Smith in 1940. It was a religious, pacifist group based on the Gandhian philosophy of non-violence. In the interest of promoting interracial good will, the members of the Ashram associated themselves with the members of a predominantly Puerto Rican neighborhood in the city. Reynolds and her associates organized games and activities for the young people who lived in East Harlem, also known as Spanish Harlem.

== The Puerto Rican Nationalist Party ==
Pedro Albizu Campos, president of the Puerto Rican Nationalist Party, and several other Nationalists were arrested and charged with "seditious conspiracy to overthrow the U.S. Government in Puerto Rico" after the events of the 1935 Río Piedras massacre. Even though he was not involved in the incident, Albizu Campos was found guilty and sentenced in 1937 to ten years of prison, to be served at the Federal penitentiary in Atlanta, Georgia.

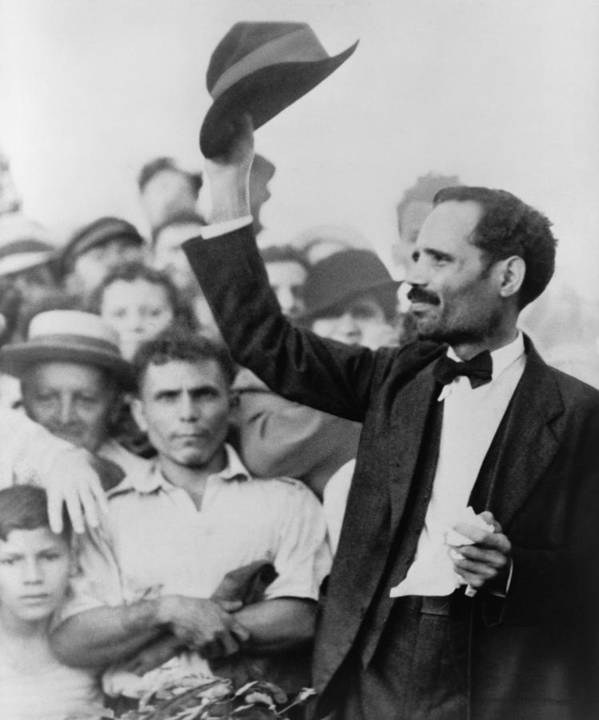
Don Pedro Albizu Campos, 1936

In 1943, while still serving his sentence, Albizu Campos became seriously ill and had to be interned at the Columbus Hospital of New York City. During his stay in the hospital, he learned of the work that the Harlem Ashram was doing with the local Puerto Ricans. He asked Julio Pinto Gandía, a member of the Nationalist Party of Puerto Rico, to bring the group to his bedside because he wanted to meet them. Reynolds and the others went to meet Albizu Campos as requested. That was the beginning of a lifelong friendship between Reynolds and Albizu Campos.

Not only had Albizu Campos learned about the group's activities with the Puerto Rican community, he'd also learned that the group was involved with the non-violent "Free India" movement." He convinced their group to become involved with a "Free Puerto Rico" movement, since he thought it was a comparable case of colonialism – the United States' colonization of Puerto Rico. Even though the members of the group opposed the use of violence as a way of obtaining independence, they did agree that Puerto Rico should have its independence and became advocates of the island's independence.

Soon afterwards, Reynolds and her colleagues founded the American League for Puerto Rico's Independence and she was named Executive Secretary. In 1945, Reynolds made her first trip to Puerto Rico in order to see the social, economic, and political conditions in the island. From 1946 to 1947, Reynolds appeared before the United Nations, where she lobbied in favor of Puerto Rico's independence. She charged that the treatment of Puerto Rico by the United States was in violation of the "Declaration Regarding Non-Self-Governing Territories" set forth in Chapter 11, Article 73 of the United Nations Charter. She also testified before the United States Congress in regard to the situation of the island. She returned to the island on 1948, to investigate the student strike at the University of Puerto Rico.

== Puerto Rican Nationalist Party Revolts of the 1950s ==
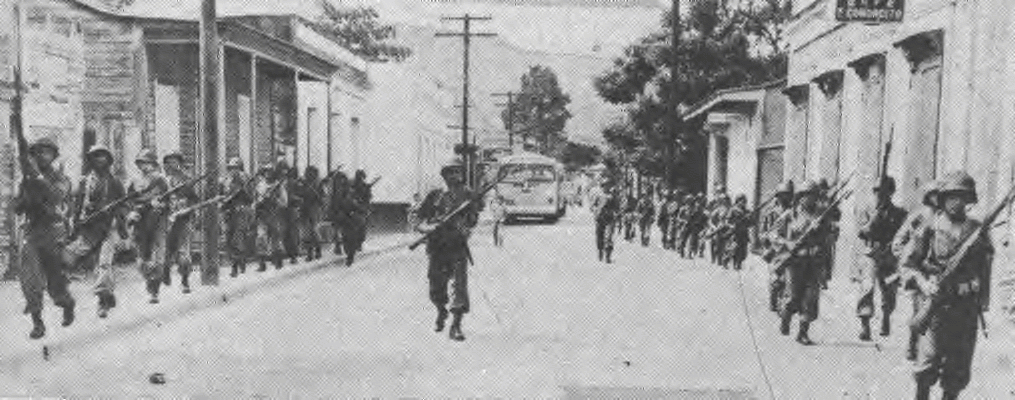
The National Guard, commanded by the Puerto Rico Adjutant General Major General Luis R. Esteves and under the orders of Gov. Luis Muñoz Marín, occupy Jayuya

The Puerto Rican Nationalist Party Revolts of the 1950s was a widespread campaign for independence by the Puerto Rican Nationalist Party, against United States Government rule over Puerto Rico. It specifically repudiated the so-called "Free Associated State" (Estado Libre Asociado) designation of Puerto Rico – a designation that the nationalists considered a "colonial farce".

The revolts began on October 30, 1950, upon the orders of Nationalist leader Pedro Albizu Campos, with uprisings in various towns, among them Peñuelas, Mayagüez, Naranjito, Arecibo, and Ponce. The most notable uprisings occurred in Utuado, Jayuya, and San Juan.

In Utuado, captured insurgents were executed. In Jayuya, the "Free Republic of Puerto Rico" was declared, until the U.S. sent bomber planes, heavy artillery, and Army infantry troops to end the uprising. In San Juan the Nationalists made an attempt against the governor of Puerto Rico at his residence, La Fortaleza.

When the revolts began, Reynolds was asleep in her home in San Juan. At 2 A.M. she was awakened when more than forty armed policemen and National Guardsmen showed up at her doorstep. Even though they did not have a search warrant they proceeded to search the house, and confiscated her papers and speeches. When she asked them if they had a search warrant they answered that they didn't but that they did have an order to arrest her. The police claimed that their actions were justified under the provisions the Ley de la Mordaza (Gag Law, technically "Law 53 of 1948"). Reynolds was taken into custody along with Carmen María Pérez Gonzalez and Olga Viscal Garriga. She was held for several days at police headquarters before she was transferred to La Princesa Prison.

In January 1951, she was charged with two counts of sedition: for allegedly riding in a car which carried weapons and for pledging her loyalty to the Nationalist Party during a party meeting in December 1949. The government claimed that, in doing so, Reynolds had pledged her life and fortune to the "illegal, criminal, and malicious overthrow" of the U.S.-backed government in Puerto Rico. In September 1951 she was found guilty and sentenced to six years of hard labor in the Insular Penitentiary in Arecibo.

== Americans for Puerto Rico's Independence ==
The American League for Puerto Rico's Independence was dissolved as a direct result of Reynolds incarceration. Her friends organized "The Ruth Reynolds Defense Committee" and raised funds for her defense. In June, they raised enough funds to pay for bail and she was released. Reynolds then returned to New York City and was legally represented by Conrad Lynn, an attorney who fought many important segregation and civil liberties cases. He successfully defended Reynolds against the charge of collaboration with the Puerto Rican Nationalist movement in the advocacy of the overthrow of the U.S. government. In 1954, she won her case on appeal in the Supreme Court in Puerto Rico. Reynolds returned once more to New York and worked as an assistant librarian and archivist at the New York Psychoanalytic Institute.

On March 1, 1954, a group of four Nationalists, which included Lolita Lebrón, Rafael Cancel Miranda, Andrés Figueroa Cordero, and Irvin Flores, unfurled a Puerto Rican flag and opened fire on the Representatives of the 83rd Congress, with the intention of capturing worldwide attention to the cause of Puerto Rican independence, wounding five congressmen. One of the consequences of this event was the arrest of Albizu Campos, who at the time was in ill health. Reynolds, with the aid of the American League for Puerto Rico's Independence, helped to defend Albizu Campos and the four Nationalists involved in the shooting incident.

Reynolds remained a close friend of Albizu Campos until his death in 1965 and continued in her quest for Puerto Rican independence. She revived the "American League for Puerto Rico's Independence" and changed the organizations name to "Americans for Puerto Rico's Independence." Under her leadership, the organization presented itself in the United Nations and requested that the UN governing body investigate the US claim that Puerto Rico was now enjoying "self-government," and to also investigate the "repression" of members of the independence movement. In 1977, Reynolds made another presentation to the UN on behalf of Puerto Rico, this time to the Decolonization Committee of the United Nations.

== Later years ==
Reynolds received many tributes from the Independence movement in Puerto Rico during her lifetime. She worked on behalf of the Puerto Rican political prisoners as a member of the "Committee for the Release of the Five Nationalists." She participated in oral history interviews for various educational institutions, among them the Center for Puerto Rican Studies at Hunter College, the Schomburg Center for Research in Black Culture of the New York Public Library, and Columbia University. Reynolds published her book "Campus in Bondage: a 1948 Microcosm of Puerto Rico in Bondage," in which she tells the story of the revolt and strike at the University of Puerto Rico. On December 2, 1989, Reynolds died near her home in South Dakota.

== Written work ==
Reynolds's book, published shortly before her death:

- Campus in Bondage: A Nineteen Forty-Eight Microcosm of Puerto Rico in Bondage; author: Ruth M. Reynolds; co-authors: Carlos R. Fraticelli and Blanca Vázquez-Erazo; Publisher: Hunter College (June 1989); ISBN 978-1-878483-00-3

== Legacy ==
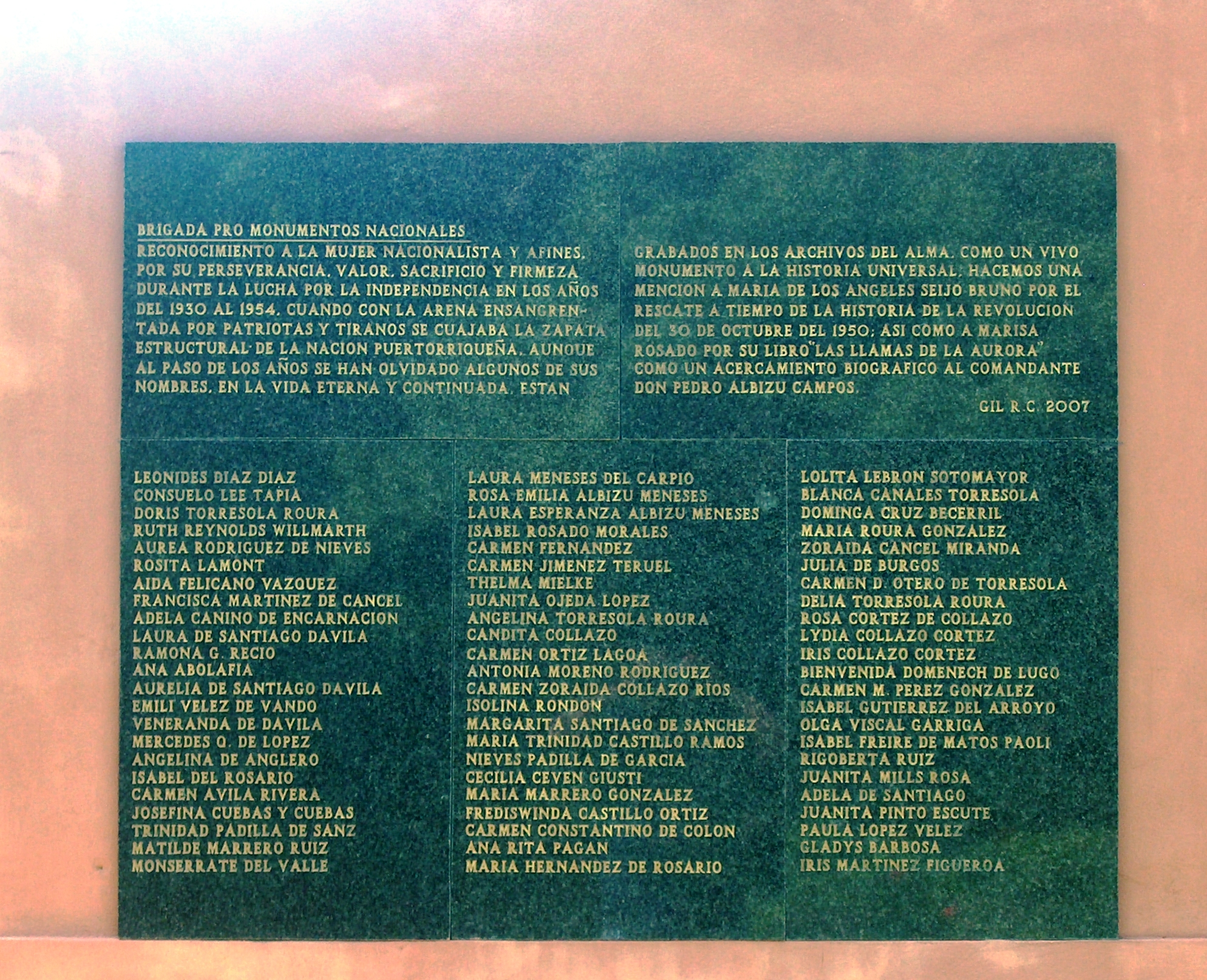
Plaque honoring the women of the Puerto Rican Nationalist Party

Noelle Ghoussaini wrote and directed a play in New York City titled Ruth and the Great Gust of Wind, which conveys the experience of Reynolds and the Puerto Rican independence movement. The play premiered at Les Manouches Theatre's Between the Seas literary reading festival in October 2010.

In the town of Mayagüez, there is a plaque which honors the women of the Puerto Rican Nationalist Party. It was incorporated into the monument to the Nationalist fighters of the Jayuya Uprising. Reynolds's name is inscribed as Ruth Mary Reynolds Willmarth in accordance with Latin American naming customs which use both the paternal and maternal surnames. Her name is located on the fourth line of the first plate.

== See also ==
- List of Puerto Ricans

19th Century female leaders of the Puerto Rican Independence Movement

- María de las Mercedes Barbudo
- Lola Rodríguez de Tió
- Mariana Bracetti

Female members of the Puerto Rican Nationalist Party

- Blanca Canales
- Rosa Collazo
- Julia de Burgos
- Lolita Lebrón
- Isabel Rosado
- Isabel Freire de Matos
- Isolina Rondón
- Olga Viscal Garriga

Articles related to the Puerto Rican Independence Movement

- Puerto Rican Nationalist Party Revolts of the 1950s
- Puerto Rican Nationalist Party
- Ponce massacre
- Río Piedras massacre
- Puerto Rican Independence Party
- Grito de Lares
- Intentona de Yauco
