= Isabel Freire de Matos =

Puerto Rican activist and writer

- Born: February 2, 1915; Cidra, Puerto Rico
- Died: September 30, 2004 (aged 89); Rio Piedras, Puerto Rico
- Education: University of Puerto Rico (B.Ed.)
- Occupations: Writer; educator; journalist
- Political party: Puerto Rican Nationalist Party
- Movement: Puerto Rican Independence
- Spouse: Francisco Matos Paoli
- Children: Susana Isabel; María Soledad

Isabel Freire de Matos (Note: This name uses Spanish marriage naming customs; the first is the woman's maiden family name "Freire" and the second, or matrimonial, family name is "de Matos".) (February 2, 1915 – September 30, 2004) was a writer, educator, journalist, and activist for Puerto Rican independence. Freire de Matos was the author of several children's books and the wife of Francisco Matos Paoli, a high-ranking member of the Puerto Rican Nationalist Party.

== Early years ==
Freire de Matos (birth name: Isabel Freire Meléndez) was born in the town of Cidra, Puerto Rico. There she received her primary and secondary education. During her years as a child she became interested in juvenile literature and poetry. After graduating from high school she attended the University of Puerto Rico where she earned a Bachelor of Education.

During her years as a student at the university she became interested in the Puerto Rican Nationalist Party and an advocate for Puerto Rico's independence. She continued her postgraduate studies in the UPR and moved to Paris, France, for a year to study comparative literature at the Sorbonne. There she met Francisco Matos Paoli, a fellow independence advocate who in 1942 became her husband.

== Educator ==
After she returned to Puerto Rico, she began to work in the public and private school systems of the island. She co-authored a children's book titled El libro Isla para niños (The island book for children) with her husband.

== Nationalist revolts of the 1950s ==
On May 21, 1948, a bill was introduced before the Puerto Rican Senate which would restrain the rights of the independence and nationalist movements on the archipelago. The Senate, which at the time was controlled by the Partido Popular Democrático (PPD) and presided by Luis Muñoz Marín, approved the bill. This bill, which resembled the anti-communist Smith Act passed in the United States in 1940, became known as the Ley de la Mordaza (Gag Law, technically "Law 53 of 1948") when the U.S.-appointed governor of Puerto Rico, Jesús T. Piñero, signed it into law on June 10, 1948. Under this new law it became a crime to print, publish, sell, or exhibit any material intended to paralyze or destroy the insular government; or to organize any society, group or assembly of people with a similar destructive intent. It made it illegal to sing a patriotic song, and reinforced the 1898 law that had made it illegal to display the Flag of Puerto Rico, with anyone found guilty of disobeying the law in any way being subject to a sentence of up to ten years imprisonment, a fine of up to US$10,000 (equivalent to $134,000 in 2025), or both. According to Dr. Leopoldo Figueroa, a non-PPD member of the Puerto Rico House of Representatives, the law was repressive and was in violation of the First Amendment to the US Constitution which guarantees Freedom of Speech. He pointed out that the law as such was a violation of the civil rights of the people of Puerto Rico. In 1949, the Nationalist Party held an assembly in the town of Arecibo and named Paoli Secretary General of the party. Some of his duties as Secretary General of the party included the presentation of patriotic speeches. Due to Law 53, these duties placed her husband on a collision course with the U.S. government.

In September 1950, her husband traveled to the towns of Cabo Rojo, Santurce, Guánica and Lares, where he participated in Nationalist activities. On October 30, the Nationalists staged uprisings in the towns of Ponce, Mayagüez, Naranjito, Arecibo, Utuado (Utuado Uprising), San Juan (San Juan Nationalist revolt), and Jayuya (Jayuya Uprising). On November 2, 1950, the police arrived at their home in Río Piedras and searched for guns and explosives. The only thing they found was a Puerto Rican flag but, due to Law 53 (the Gag Law), this enabled them to arrest and accuse her husband of treason against the United States. The evidence used against him was the Puerto Rican flag in their home, and four speeches he'd made in favor of Puerto Rican independence.

On the basis of this "evidence" her husband was fired from his professorship at the University of Puerto Rico, and sentenced to a twenty-year prison term, which was later reduced to ten years. In jail, her husband shared his cell with Pedro Albizu Campos. Campos suffered from ulcerations on his legs and body caused by radiation, and her husband tended to his needs.

Her husband wrote patriotic poems on scraps of paper which were smuggled out of the prison by Freire de Matos. She tried to get them published and even though they were inoffensive, the context of the "Gag Law" and its intended effect, to silence all opposition made the poems take on a different meaning.

Her husband was released on probation on January 16, 1952. However, on March 2, 1954, after the Nationalists attack of the U.S. House of Representatives, the U.S. government ordered the wholesale arrest of Nationalist Party members including her husband, who was not involved in the incident.

In 1954, Freire de Matos founded the "Escuela Maternal Hostoniana" (Maternal Hostonian School) named after Eugenio María de Hostos". On May 26, 1955, after ten months in jail and in poor health, her husband was finally pardoned by Puerto Rican Governor Luis Muñoz Marín.

== Author ==
Freire de Matos continued to teach and write. In her college she established a creative experimental method in which she explored the balance between freedom and nature among individuals. She hoped that with her methods her students would develop positive attitudes and love for education. She hoped that her students had would fully develop their talents.

=== Written works ===
Among her written works are the following:

- La poesía en la escuela elemental, (Poetry in elementary school) 1962
- Poesía menuda, (Poetry menuda) 1965
- ABC de Puerto Rico, (ABC of Puerto Rico) 1968
- La casita misteriosa y otros cuentos, (The mysterious house and other stories) 1979
- La brujita encantada y otros cuentos, (The enchanted little witch and other stories) 1979
- Juego para los dedos, (A finger game) 1980
- Isla para los niños, (An island for children) 1981
- Eugenio María de Hostos para la juventud, Eugenio María de Hostos for the young) 1989
- Ritmos de tierra y mar, (Rhythms of the earth and sea) 1992
- La poesía y el niño, (Poetry and children) 1993
- El teatro y el niño, (Theatre and children) 1995
- El pajarito feliz, (The happy little bird) 1996
- Los derechos del niño, (The rights of children) 1996
- El cuento y el niño, (Story telling and children) 1997
- Liza en el parque de las palomas, (Liza in the Park of the pigeons) 2000

== Later years ==
In 1968, Freire de Matos collaborated as a co-author with Rubén del Rosario, in the publication of Antonio Martorell's "ABC de Puerto Rico". The publication is used in Puerto Rico's elementary schools. On 1971, she also collaborated with the publication of Fe Acosta de González's "Matemáticas modernas en el nivel elementa" (Modern Math at the elementary level.

Francisco Matos Paoli died on July 10, 2000, in their home in Rio Piedras, Puerto Rico. Freire de Matos died four years later on September 30, 2004. They were survived by two daughters, Susana Isabel and María Soledad, and four grandchildren.

There is a plaque, located at the monument to the Jayuya Uprising participants in Mayagüez, Puerto Rico, honoring the women of the Puerto Rican Nationalist Party. Freire de Matos' name is on the sixteenth line of the third plate.

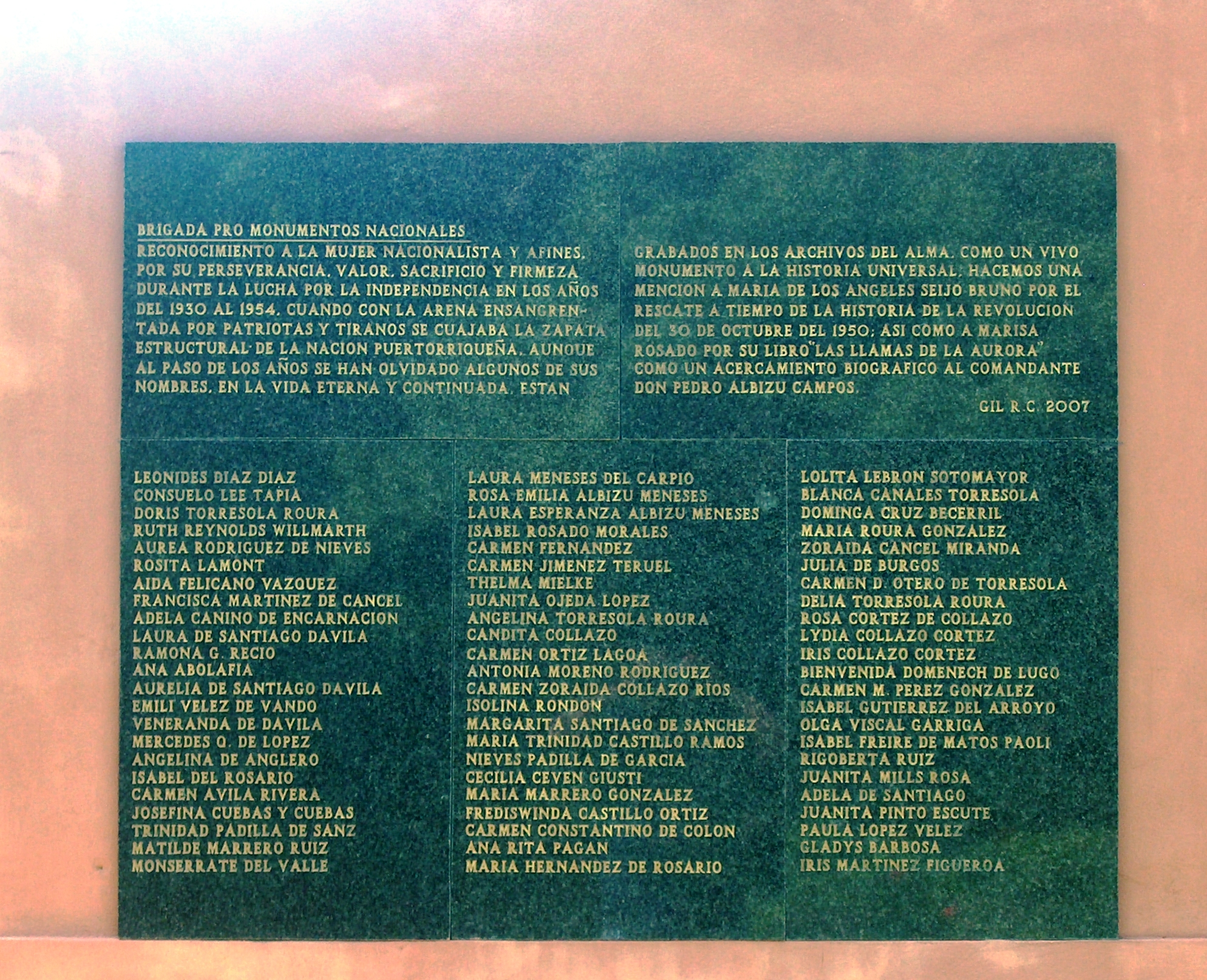
Plaque honoring the women of the Puerto Rican Nationalist Party

== See also ==
- List of Puerto Ricans
- History of women in Puerto Rico

19th Century female leaders of the Puerto Rican Independence Movement

- María de las Mercedes Barbudo
- Lola Rodríguez de Tió
- Mariana Bracetti

Female members of the Puerto Rican Nationalist Party

- Blanca Canales
- Rosa Collazo
- Julia de Burgos
- Lolita Lebrón
- Ruth Mary Reynolds
- Isabel Rosado
- Isolina Rondón
- Olga Viscal Garriga

Articles related to the Puerto Rican Independence Movement

- Puerto Rican Nationalist Party Revolts of the 1950s
- Puerto Rican Nationalist Party
- Ponce massacre
- Río Piedras massacre
- Puerto Rican Independence Party
- Grito de Lares
- Intentona de Yauco
