= Terraville, South Dakota =

Terraville
- Ghost town
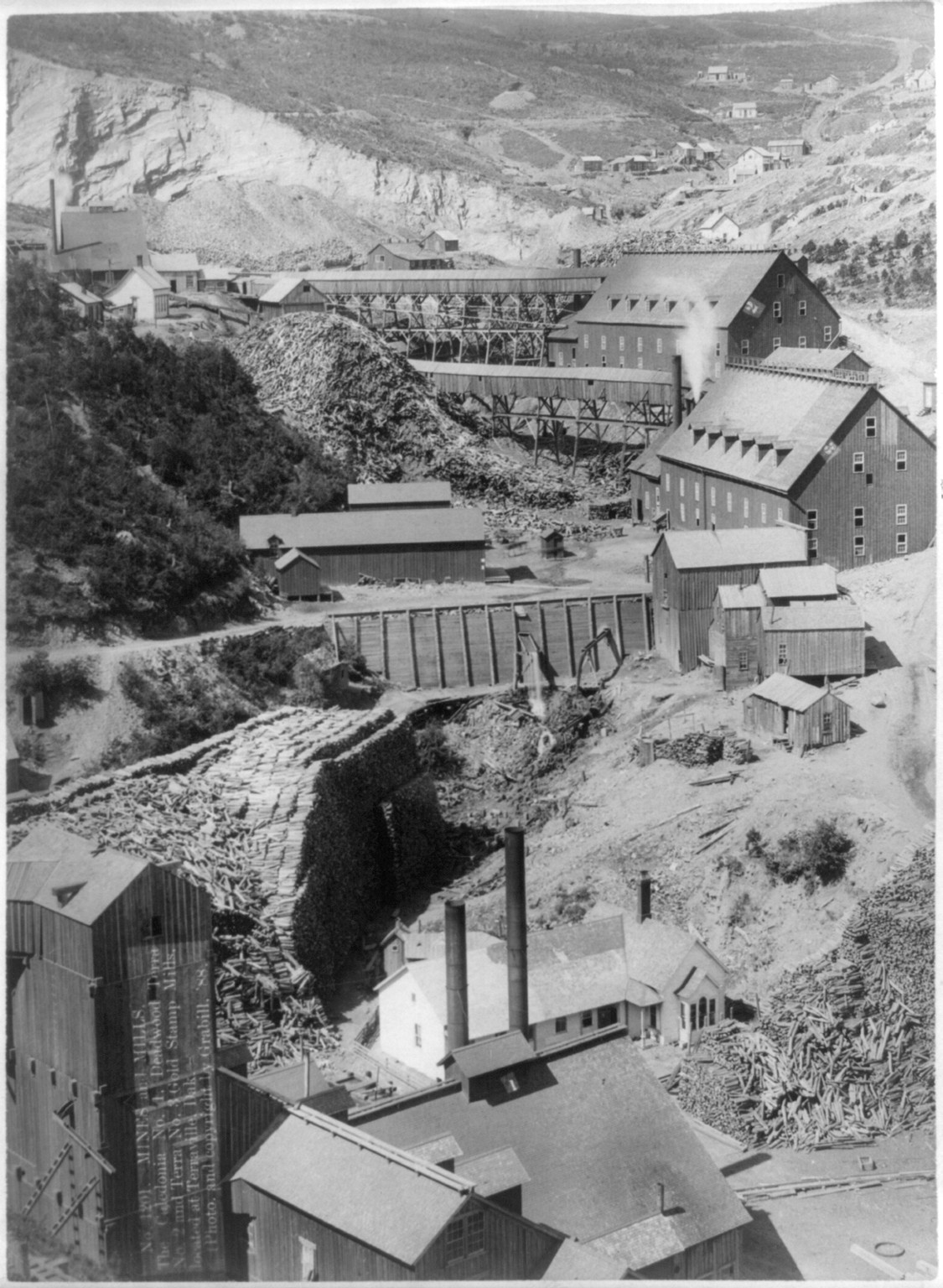
- Terraville in 1888.

- Location in the state of South Dakota
- Coordinates: 44.3622065°N 103.7646429°W
- Country: United States of America
- State: South Dakota
- County: Lawrence County
- Elevation: 5,148 ft (1,569 m)
- Time zone: UTC-7 (MST)
  - Summer (DST): UTC-6 (MDT)

Terraville is a ghost town in Lawrence County, South Dakota, United States. It was founded in 1877 as a mining camp and later evolved into a town. It was purchased by the Homestake Mining Company and was destroyed in 1982 to make way for a new mine.

== History ==
In the 1870s, four men–Moses and Fred Manuel, Hank Herney, and Alex Engh–entered the area on the hunt for gold. They each filed a claim in Bobtail Gulch on February 21, 1876. That spring, they discovered a rich lode, and on April 9, 1876, they located it under the name Homestake. The claim was later bought by men from California, who formed the Homestake Mining Company. Used as the first headquarters of the Homestake, Terraville was founded in 1877 and became a home for the miners–and their families–of the local mines, including the Caledonia, Terra, and Deadwood. A tunnel was built by the company to connect Terraville to Lead. This tunnel was used both to carry ore from the Homestake Mine to the smelters in Terraville and also as a path for residents to travel between the towns. In 1880, 775 people lived in the town, making it the fifth-largest town in the Black Hills at that time. During Terraville's golden years, 220 stamp mills were in operation. The town grew to include several stores; bars; churches, the most notable and longest-surviving of which was the Terraville Methodist Church; a schoolhouse; a hospital; boarding houses; and several houses. 280 steps connected various parts of the town and the surrounding area and mines. Water rights were secured for the town by the company. In 1900, approximately 700 people used the town's post office.

The Homestake Mining Company later moved its headquarters and mining activities to Lead. By the 1970s, most of the residents of Terraville traveled to Lead for shopping and work. Terraville didn't have a mayor or law enforcement, except for the county sheriff. In the summer of 1982, the post office closed, the town was destroyed, and the 723 residents were forced to move when the Homestake Mining Company decided to create an open cut mine at Terraville. The Homestake called it the Terraville Test Pit Project. Every building, most of them at least 100 years old, was torn down; at 102 years old, the Terraville Methodist Church was the oldest operating church west of the Mississippi River at the time of its demolition, and plans to make it a historical landmark had emerged. Today, only remnants of the roads remain. An annual reunion for the former residents of Terraville has been held every year since at least 2001 in Deadwood.

== Geography ==
Terraville is located in the Black Hills of Lawrence County, South Dakota. It was built on the peak of a mountain between Lead and Central City, just above the Homestake Mine. Deadwood Gulch and the ghost town of Lincoln are also nearby.

== Notable person ==
- Ruth Mary Reynolds (1916-1989), born in Terraville, American teacher and political and civil rights activist
