= Mariana Bracetti =

Puerto Rican activist (1825–1903)

Mariana Bracetti Cuevas
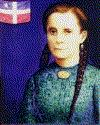
- "Brazo de Oro" (Golden Arm)
- Born: July 26, 1825; Añasco, Puerto Rico
- Died: February 25, 1903 (age 77); Añasco, Puerto Rico
- Occupation: Puerto Rico independence movement leader
- Spouse: Miguel Rojas

Mariana Bracetti Cuevas (also spelled Bracety) (July 26, 1825 – February 25, 1903) was a patriot and leader of the Puerto Rico independence movement. Although Bracetti is popularly credited with having sewed the Grito de Lares flag that was intended to be used as the national emblem of Puerto Rico in its first of two attempts to overthrow Spanish rule and establish an independent republic in 1868, it was fellow revolutionary Eduviges Beauchamp Sterling who embroidered the flag, while Bracetti was in charge of the encrypted communications used for the planning and execution of the revolt.

== Early years ==
Bracetti, born in the city of Añasco, Puerto Rico, met and developed a romantic relationship with Miguel Rojas Luzardo, a rich Venezuelan businessman visiting Añasco. Rojas and his brother Manuel owned a coffee plantation called "El Triunfo" near Lares. Miguel and Manuel Rojas were admirers of Dr. Ramón Emeterio Betances and were influenced by his ideals of independence for and beyond Puerto Rico. Bracetti married Rojas with whom she had children.

== The first independence movement flag of Puerto Rico ==
Bracetti then moved to the hacienda "El Triunfo", which was to become the clandestine nucleus of the revolution that would be known as El Grito de Lares. The Rojas' admiration for Betances led them to join him in the conspiracy to rebel against, and gain independence from Spain.

The Rojas brothers became the independence leaders in Lares and their code name was Centro Bravo (Bravo Center). Manuel Rojas, Bracetti's brother-in-law, was named Commander of the Liberation Army. Mathias Brugman was the independence leader in Mayagüez and his group went by the code name of Capa Prieto (Dark Cape).

Bracetti was appointed the leader of the "Lares's Revolutionary Council." She has been identified as Brazo de Oro (Golden Arm), as she was thought to have sewed the flag for the Grito de Lares (Cry of Lares) revolt and the independent "Republic of Puerto Rico." However, the flag was embroidered by fellow revolutionary Eduvigis Beauchamp Sterling, while Bracetti was in charge of the encrypted communications used for the planning and execution of the revolt.

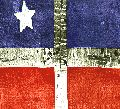
The original Lares revolutionary flag. The first "Puerto Rican Flag" used in the unsuccessful Grito de Lares (Lares Uprising).

Beauchamp designed and knitted the flag taking into consideration Betances's suggestions. The flag was divided in the middle by a white Latin cross, the two lower corners are red and the two upper corners are blue. A white star was placed in the upper left blue corner. According to Puerto Rican poet Luis Lloréns Torres the white cross on the Revolutionary Flag of Lares stands for the yearning for homeland redemption; the red squares, the blood poured by the heroes of the rebellion and the white star in the blue solitude square, stands for liberty and freedom.

== El Grito de Lares ==
On the morning of September 23, 1868, an Army of about 800 men met in the El Triunfo plantation and Manuel Rojas proceeded to take the town of Lares, which initiated the revolution known as El Grito de Lares. Once the town was taken, Bracetti's flag was placed on the High Altar of the Parroquial Church. The revolutionists declared Puerto Rico a republic, swore in Francisco Ramírez Medina as its first president and celebrated a speedy mass.

The rebel forces then departed to take over the next town, San Sebastián del Pepino. The Spanish militia, however, surprised the group with strong resistance, causing great confusion among the armed rebels who, led by Manuel Rojas, retreated back to Lares. Upon an order from the governor, Julián Pavía, the Spanish militia soon rounded up the rebels. All of the survivors, including Bracetti, were imprisoned in Arecibo and the insurrection was quickly brought to an end. The original Lares flag was taken by a Spanish army officer as a war prize. It is now exhibited in the Museum of the Army in Toledo, Spain. Eighty of the prisoners died in jail, Bracetti however, lived and was released on January 20, 1869, when the new Spanish Republican government granted them general amnesty. Mariana Bracetti died in the municipality of Añasco, Puerto Rico in 1903 and was buried in the Plaza of Añasco. There is a monument honoring her on the spot where she is buried.

== Legacy ==
Juan de Mata Terreforte, a revolutionist who fought alongside Manuel Rojas in the Grito de Lares, and who was the Vice-President of Puerto Rican Revolutionary Committee, a Chapter of the Cuban Revolutionary Party in New York City, used the Lares flag as the standard to represent an independent Puerto Rico until 1895, when the current design, modeled after the Cuban flag, was unveiled and adopted by the committee.

Bracetti was the principal subject of two books: El Grito de Lares by Luis Lloréns Torres, and Brazo de Oro by Cesáreo Rosa-Nieves. Her memory has been honored in Puerto Rico and elsewhere with schools, streets and avenues named after her. In Lares, there is a Mariana Bracetti Museum and in Philadelphia there is a Mariana Bracetti Academy Charter School. The Mariana Bracetti Plaza and public housing development in New York City was also named after her. The public housing development built and maintained by the New York City Housing Authority in New York City's Lower East Side.

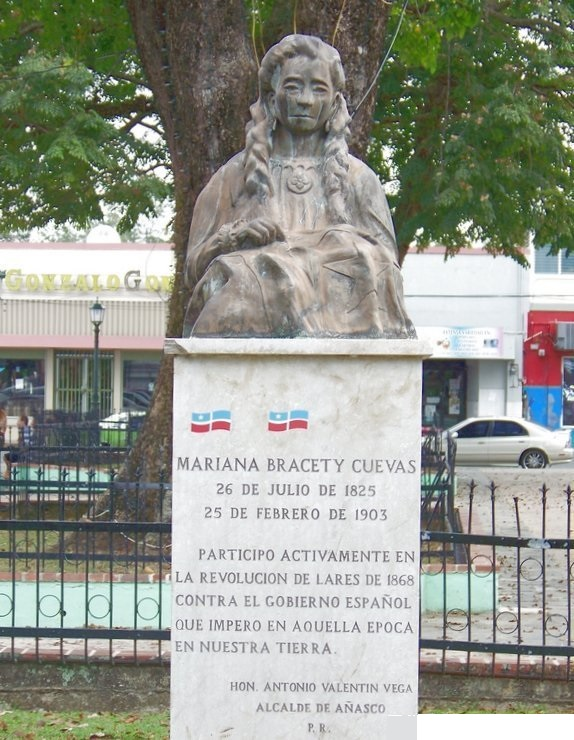
Statue of Mariana Bracety Cuevas in Añasco barrio-pueblo

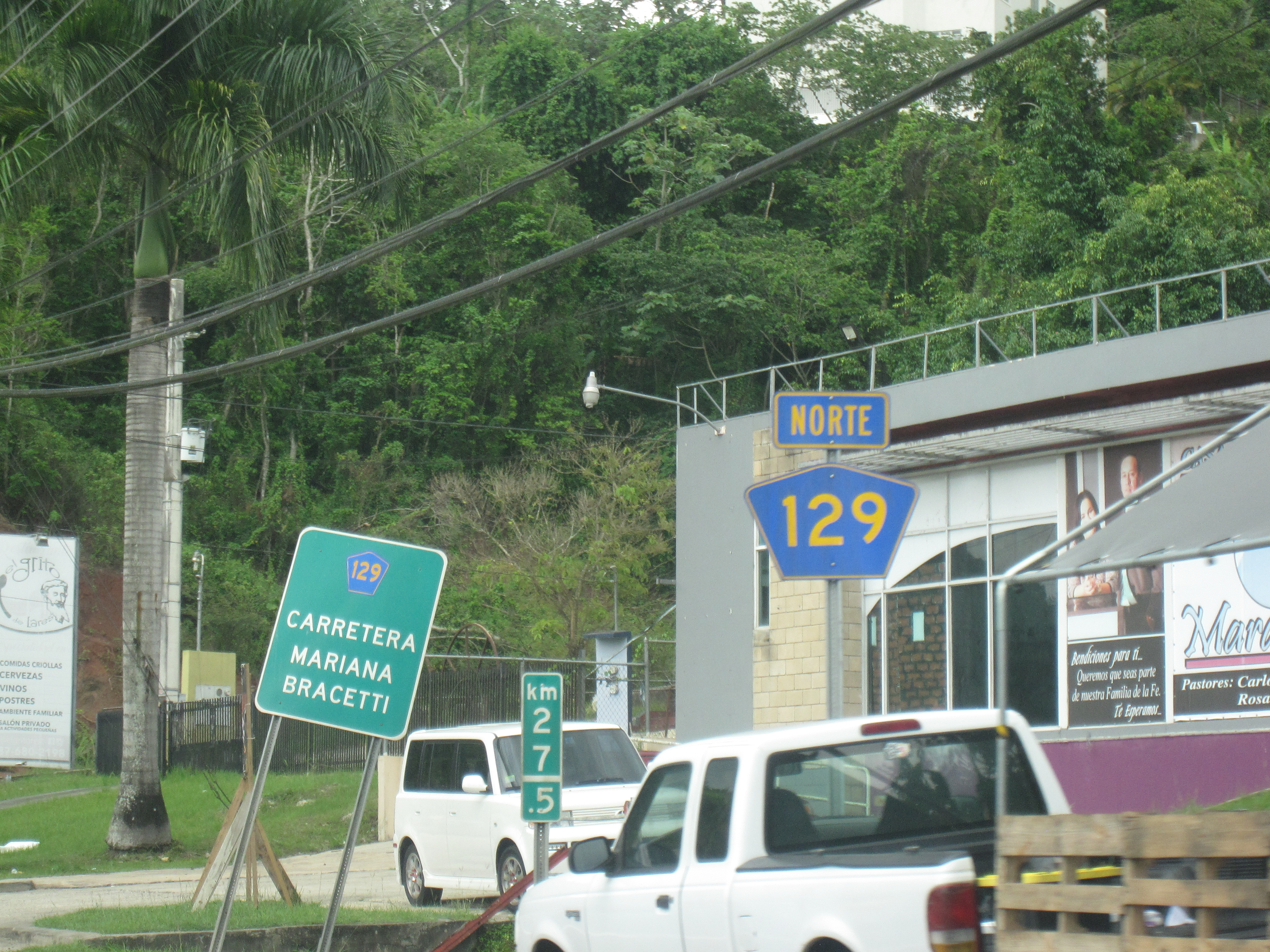
Puerto Rico Highway 129 is also called Carretera Mariana Bracetti near km 27.5 in Lares, Puerto Rico

== See also ==
- Corsican immigration to Puerto Rico
- List of Puerto Ricans
- History of women in Puerto Rico

19th century female leaders of the Puerto Rican independence movement

- María de las Mercedes Barbudo
- Lola Rodríguez de Tió

Female members of the Puerto Rican Nationalist Party

- Blanca Canales
- Rosa Collazo
- Lolita Lebrón
- Ruth Mary Reynolds
- Isabel Rosado
- Isabel Freire de Matos
- Isolina Rondón
- Olga Viscal Garriga

Articles related to the Puerto Rican Independence Movement

- Puerto Rican Nationalist Party Revolts of the 1950s
- Puerto Rican Nationalist Party
- Ponce massacre
- Río Piedras massacre
- Puerto Rican Independence Party
- Grito de Lares
- Intentona de Yauco
