= Vincent Mroz =

American Secret Service agent (1922–2008)

- Mroz displays the Luger pistol used in attempted assassination of Harry Truman
- Born: March 11, 1922; Stanley, Wisconsin, U.S.
- Died: July 22, 2008 (aged 86); Adrian, Michigan, U.S.
- Education: University of Michigan; Michigan State College
- Occupation: Secret Service agent
- Spouse: Shirley Gamm (m. 1945)
- Children: Barbara and Gregory

Vincent Peter Mroz (March 11, 1922 – July 22, 2008) was a United States Secret Service agent and a United States Marine Corps veteran who served during World War II. In 1948, he was assigned to the presidential protection detail during the Harry S. Truman administration. In November 1950, Mroz shot one of two Puerto Rican nationalists who intended to assassinate President Truman. The man was later tried and imprisoned. The event was described as "the biggest gunfight in Secret Service history." The other nationalist was killed by White House Police Officer Leslie Coffelt.

Mroz also served the presidential detail in the Dwight D. Eisenhower administration. He served with the Secret Service for 26 years, retiring in 1974 as the Deputy Assistant Director of the uniformed division.

Mroz had earlier played college football for the University of Michigan and Michigan State College.

== Early years ==
Vincent Mroz was born in Stanley, Wisconsin in 1922, the son of Polish immigrants. His family later moved to East Chicago, Indiana. Mroz attended Washington High School as part of the Class of 1941. In the fall of 1940, he played at the guard and tackle positions for the Washington High School football team. At the time of the 1940 United States Census, he was living in East Chicago with his mother Antonia and his stepfather Martin Gzik.

While in college, he played at the end position for the 1943 Michigan Wolverines football team that compiled an 8–1 record and was ranked No. 3 in the final AP Poll.

== Marriage and family ==
While still serving in the military as a lieutenant in the Marine Corps, Mroz married in October 1945 to Shirley Gamm at the Mt. Vernon Place Methodist Church in Washington, D.C. They had two children, Barbara and Gregory Mroz.

== Attack on Blair House ==
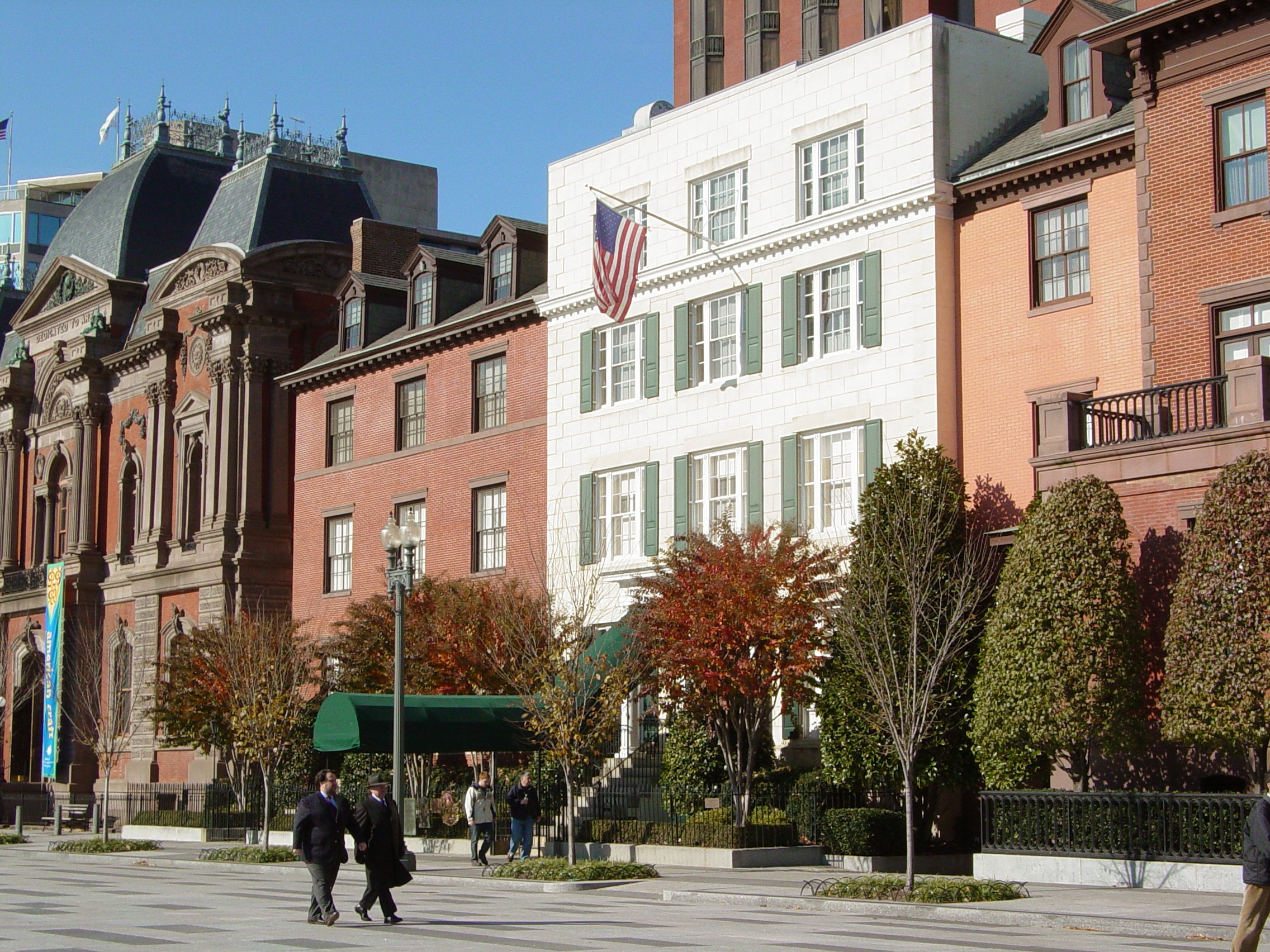
Blair House, site of the 1950 Truman assassination attempt

In 1948, Mroz went to work for the United States Secret Service. He was assigned to the presidential protection detail for Harry S. Truman.

In the fall of 1950, President Harry Truman's household was moved to Blair House on Lafayette Square while the White House was being renovated. He walked between there and his office in the West Wing. On November 1, 1950, Mroz engaged in a gunfight with two Puerto Rican nationalists who were storming Blair House in an assassination attempt on President Truman, upstairs in his quarters. One of the attackers, Oscar Collazo, shot a White House police officer at the guard house and began walking up the front steps of Blair House. After hearing the gunshots, Mroz ran through a basement corridor and stepped out of a street-level door on the east side of the House, where he opened fire on Collazo, shooting him in the chest and dropping him. Mroz stopped Collazo on the outside steps with a bullet to the chest. The incident has been described as "the biggest gunfight in Secret Service History." Two other officers took part in the shooting of the attackers.

In 40 seconds, a total of 27 shots were exchanged among officers and attackers. After the shooting ceased, Mroz discovered the body of the second attacker, Griselio Torresola, in the hedges adjacent to Blair House. He had been shot by officer Leslie Coffelt. Mroz removed a gun from Torresola's body and found two magazines of ammunition in his pockets.

In December 1951, President Truman, described as being "deeply moved," decorated Mroz and Floyd Boring with silver lapel buttons for their roles in saving him. He said they were "two straight-shooting secret service agents" and gave them formal recognition. Collazo survived and was put on trial in February 1951. At the trial, Mroz identified Collazo, "He's sitting right there with a brown suit and a red tie and glasses on." Collazo was convicted and imprisoned for decades.

== Later years ==
Mroz continued to work in the presidential protection detail during the Truman and later Dwight D. Eisenhower administrations. From 1960 to 1962, Mroz was the chief of the Charleston, West Virginia office of the Secret Service, where he gained note for his investigation of a counterfeiting ring. From 1963 to 1965, he was the head of the Kansas City office of the Secret Service. He worked for the Secret Service for 26 years. By 1971, Mroz served as Deputy Assistant Director, Protective Services.

He retired in 1974 as the Deputy Assistant Director of the Uniformed Division. Mroz moved to Adrian, Michigan after retirement. He lived there for 34 years before his death in July 2008. He was the last survivor of the Truman assassination attempt.
