= Utuado uprising =

1950 revolt against the US by Nationalist party in Utuado, Puerto Rico

- Part of Puerto Rican Nationalist Party revolts of the 1950s
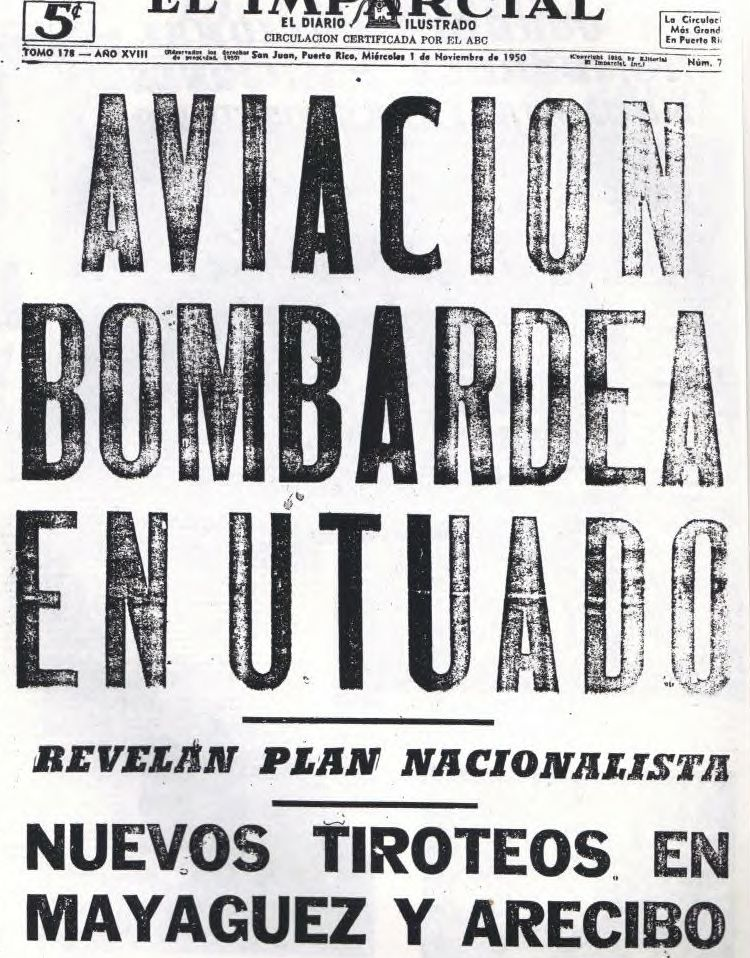
- "El Imparcial" headline "Aviation Bombs Utuado"
Date	October 30, 1950
Location	Utuado, Puerto Rico
Result	United States victory: Uprising suppressed

Belligerents
Puerto Rican Nationalist Party	United States

Commanders and leaders
Blanca Canales	(United States) Luis R. Esteves

Casualties and losses
7 killed (4 after surrendering)	3 killed (2 National Guardsmen and 1 police officer)

The Utuado uprising, also known as the Utuado revolt or El Grito de Utuado, refers to the revolt against the United States government in Puerto Rico which occurred on October 30, 1950, in the town of Utuado. There were simultaneous revolts in various other towns in Puerto Rico, including the capital of San Juan and the cities of Mayaguez and Arecibo, plus major confrontations in the city of Ponce and the towns of Peñuelas and Jayuya.

== Events leading to the revolt ==
On September 17, 1922, the Puerto Rican Nationalist Party was formed. José Coll y Cuchí, a former member of the Union Party, was elected its first president. He wanted radical changes within the economy and social welfare programs of Puerto Rico. In 1924, Pedro Albizu Campos, a lawyer, joined the party and was named its vice president.

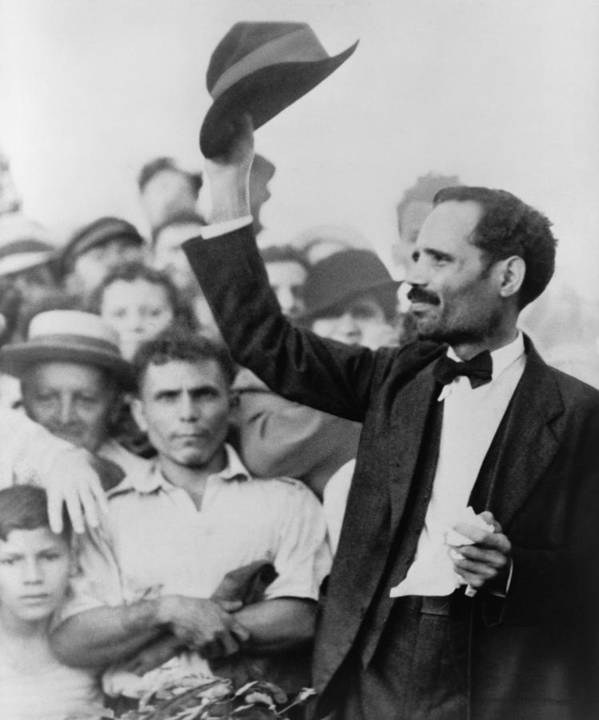
Don Pedro Albizu Campos, leader of the Puerto Rican Nationalist Party

Albizu Campos was the first Puerto Rican graduate of Harvard Law School. He served as a Second Lieutenant in the U.S. Army during World War I, and believed that Puerto Rico should be an independent nation - even if that required an armed confrontation. By 1930, Coll y Cuchi departed from the party because of his disagreements with Albizu Campos as to how the party should be run. On May 11, 1930, Albizu Campos was elected president of the Nationalist Party.

In the 1930s, the U.S.-appointed governor of Puerto Rico, Blanton Winship, and police colonel Riggs applied harsh repressive measures against the Nationalist Party. In 1936, Albizu Campos and the leaders of the party were arrested and jailed at the La Princesa prison in San Juan, and later sent to the Federal Prison at Atlanta.

On March 21, 1937, the Nationalists held a parade in Ponce and the police opened fire on the crowd, in what was to become known as the Ponce massacre. 19 people were killed, including two police officers and 17 unarmed Puerto Ricans - including a 7-year-old girl, who was shot in the back. Although the police shot the 18 people, Albizu Campos was arrested, and sentenced to ten years in a U.S. federal prison. Campos finally returned to Puerto Rico on December 15, 1947, after completing his ten-year sentence.

On May 21, 1948, a bill was introduced before the Puerto Rican Senate which would restrain the rights of the independence and Nationalist movements on the island. The Senate, controlled by the Partido Popular Democrático (PPD) and presided by Luis Muñoz Marín, approved the bill that day. This bill, which resembled the anti-communist Smith Act passed in the United States in 1940, became known as the Ley de la Mordaza (Gag Law) when the U.S.-appointed governor of Puerto Rico, Jesús T. Piñero, signed it into law on June 10, 1948.

Under this new law it would be a crime to print, publish, sell, or exhibit any material intended to paralyze or destroy the insular government; or to organize any society, group or assembly of people with a similar destructive intent. It made it illegal to sing a patriotic song, and reinforced the 1898 law that had made it illegal to display the Flag of Puerto Rico, with anyone found guilty of disobeying the law in any way being subject to a sentence of up to ten years imprisonment, a fine of up to US$10,000 (equivalent to $134,000 in 2025), or both.

According to Dr. Leopoldo Figueroa, member of the Partido Estadista Puertorriqueño (Puerto Rican Statehood Party) and the only member of the Puerto Rico House of Representatives who did not belong to the PPD, the law was repressive and in violation of the First Amendment of the US Constitution which guarantees Freedom of Speech.

On June 21, 1948, Albizu Campos gave a speech in the town of Manatí, which explained how this Gag Law violated the First Amendment of the U.S. Constitution. Nationalists from all over the island had gathered - to hear Campos's speech, and to prevent the police from arresting him.

== Uprisings ==
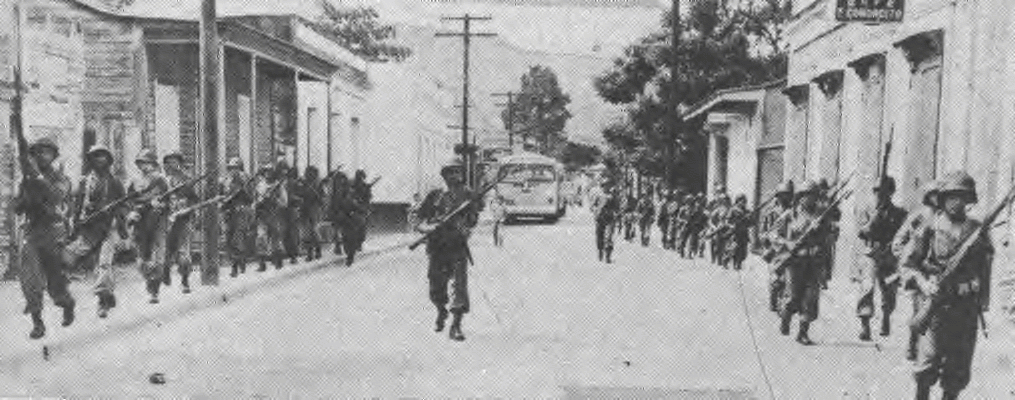
The National Guard, commanded by the Puerto Rico Adjutant General Major General Luis R. Esteves and under the orders of Gov. Luis Muñoz Marín, occupy Jayuya

From 1949 to 1950, the Nationalists began to prepare for an armed revolution. The revolution was to take place in 1952, on the date the United States Congress was to approve the creation of the political status of Free Associated State (Estado Libre Associado) for Puerto Rico.

Albizu Campos called for an armed revolution because he considered the "new political status" a colonial farce. Campos picked the town of Jayuya as the headquarters of the revolution because of its location, and weapons were stored in the home of Blanca Canales.

On October 26, 1950, Albizu Campos was holding a meeting in Fajardo when he received word that his house in San Juan was surrounded by police waiting to arrest him. He was also told that the police had already arrested other Nationalist leaders. He escaped from Fajardo and ordered the revolution to start.

On October 27, in the town of Peñuelas, the police surrounded and fired on a caravan of Nationalists, killing four. On October 30, the Nationalists staged uprisings in the towns of Ponce, Mayagüez, Naranjito, Arecibo, Utuado (Utuado Uprising), San Juan (San Juan Nationalist revolt), and Jayuya.

The first incident of the Nationalist uprisings occurred in the pre-dawn hours of October 29. The Insular Police surrounded the house of the mother of Melitón Muñiz Santos, the president of the Peñuelas Nationalist Party in the barrio Macaná, under the pretext that he was storing weapons for the Nationalist revolt. Without warning, the police fired on the house and a gunfight ensued. Two Nationalists were killed and six police officers were wounded. Nationalists Meliton Muñoz Santos, Roberto Jaume Rodriguez, Estanislao Lugo Santiago, Marcelino Turell, William Gutirrez and Marcelino Berrios were arrested and accused of participating in an ambush against the local Insular Police.

== Counter response ==
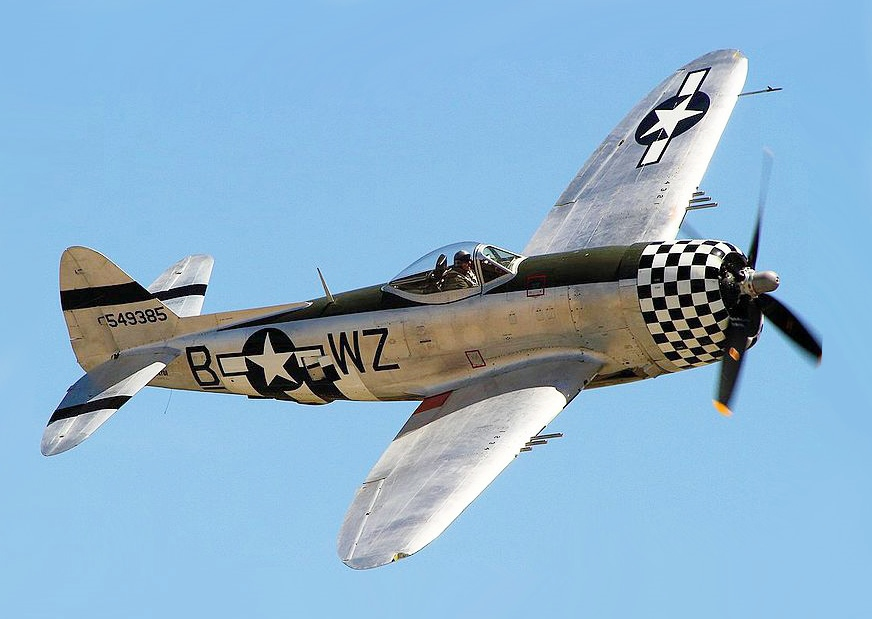
The Puerto Rico Air National Guard used the F-47 Thunderbolt, known prior to 1948 as the P-47 Thunderbolt, against Nationalists in Jayuya and Utuado.

Governor of Puerto Rico Luis Muñoz Marín declared martial law. The United States sent ten P-47 Thunderbolt fighter planes out of Ramey Air Force Base to bomb the town of Jayuya. American infantry troops and the Puerto Rico National Guard, commanded by the Puerto Rico Adjutant General Major General Luis R. Esteves, attacked the various towns involved in the Nationalist uprisings. The United States and the Puerto Rico Air National Guard used 500-pound (227 kg) bombs and M2 Browning .50-caliber (12.7 mm) machine guns, leaving Jayuya in ruins, and proceeded to bomb the neighboring town of Utuado, demolishing approximately 70% of the town.

Four Nationalists had been massacred after surrendering. After surrendering, the nine surviving Nationalists had been marched to the town plaza and were told to remove their shoes, belts and personal belongings. They were then taken behind the police station. Stationed there was a machine-gun. One National Guardsman then remarked, "You won't be killing policemen any more." All of the prisoners were then machine-gunned, killing four of them. The youngest rebel, 17-year-old Antonio González, pleaded for water. At this, a Guardsman remarked, "You want water?" before bayonetting him. Outraged local civilians went outside and called out the perpetrators as murderers. However, quickly went back inside after having warning shots fired over their heads. The bodies were left on display for the next several hours.

The Nationalist leaders in Utuado were the Captain of the Utuado branch of the Cadets of the Republic Heriberto Castro and Damián Torres. According to the plans of Albizu Campos, the Nationalists were to put up an armed resistance in their respective towns and then retreat to Utuado. Once in Utuado, the Nationalists were to continue fighting against U.S. rule, until the United Nations Security Council took notice and intervened in their favor.

According to police estimates, 28 people were killed and 50 were wounded in the uprising, including in Utuado and elsewhere in Puerto Rico. 16 Nationalists, 8 police officers and soldiers, and 4 civilians were killed. After the Nationalists were forced to surrender, the Puerto Rican government arrested thousands of people supporting independence.

Federal law mandated that U.S. President Harry Truman take direct charge in all matters concerning Puerto Rico. In addition, the Governor of Puerto Rico, Luis Muñoz Marín was required to consult directly with the White House. But this did not occur.

Some attempt to frame the events as if the Puerto Ricans bombed themselves (Luis Ferrao). Nelson Denis refutes this: "The P-47 fighter planes that bombed Utuado and Jayuya were built in the US, hangared in US airfields, maintained with US equipment, flown by US-trained pilots who dropped US-made bombs, and all of it – the planes, the airfield, the pilots, the bombs – were financed by the US. Yet Ferrao would have us believe that a decal saying “Air National Guard” means that Puerto Rico bombed itself." Denis, Nelson (28 September 2015). "The Many Lies of Luis Ferrao".

== Aftermath ==
External audio
- Newsreel scenes in Spanish of the Puerto Rican Nationalist Party Revolts of the 1950s here

The top leaders of the Nationalist party were arrested, including Albizu Campos and the leader of the Jayuya Uprising, Blanca Canales. All of them were imprisoned, and served long jail terms.

On November 1, 1950, Nationalists Griselio Torresola and Oscar Collazo attacked the Blair House with the intention of assassinating U.S. President Truman. Torresola and White House police officer Leslie Coffelt died in the failed attempt. Collazo was arrested and sentenced to death. His sentence was later commuted to life imprisonment by President Truman, and he eventually received a presidential pardon.

The last major attempt by the Puerto Rican Nationalist Party to draw world attention to Puerto Rico's colonial situation occurred on March 1, 1954. On that day, Nationalist leader Lolita Lebrón and fellow Nationalists Rafael Cancel Miranda, Irvin Flores and Andres Figueroa Cordero attacked the United States House of Representatives. Lebrón and her comrades were charged with attempted murder and other crimes. Gilberto Martínez, one of the last survivors of the Utuado Uprising, died on January 1, 2009.

== Incarcerated nationalists ==
The following is an FBI list of the Utuado Nationalists who were incarcerated in 1950 and who were still in prison as of 1954:

- Jose Aviles Maisonet
- Angel Luis Colon Feliciano
- Gilberto Martinez Negron
- Jose Angel Medina Gigueroa
- Juanita Ojeda Maldonado
- Elidio Olivera Albarran
- Octavio Ramos Rosario

== See also ==
- Elías Beauchamp
- Ducoudray Holstein Expedition
- Grito de Lares
- Intentona de Yauco
- Río Piedras massacre
- List of Puerto Ricans
