= Jayuya Uprising =

1950 Puerto Rican nationalist revolt

- Part of Puerto Rican Nationalist Party revolts of the 1950s
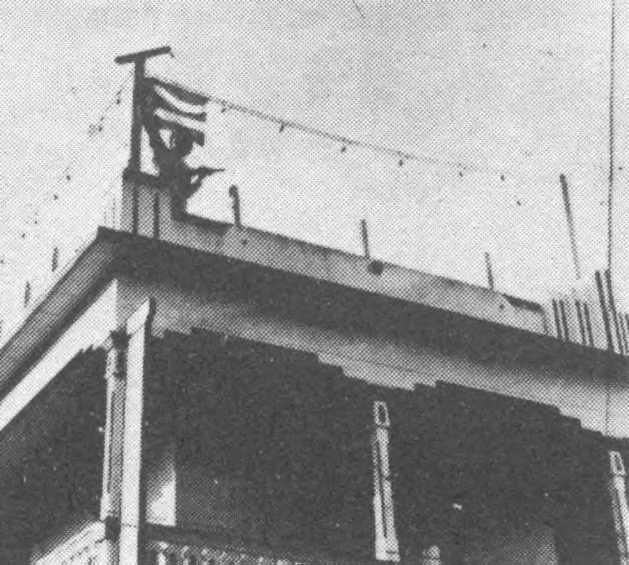
- Puerto Rican flag removed by a member of the National Guard after the 1950 Jayuya Uprising
Date	October 30, 1950
Location	Jayuya, Puerto Rico
Result	American victory: Uprising suppressed

Belligerents
Puerto Rican Nationalist Party	United States

Commanders and leaders
Blanca Canales	(United States) Luis R. Esteves

Casualties and losses
16 Nationalists dead	8 police officers and soldiers dead
- 4 civilians dead, 50 civilians injured

The Jayuya Uprising, also known as Jayuya Revolt or Cry of Jayuya (Spanish: Grito de Jayuya), was a Nationalist revolt that took place on October 30, 1950, in the town of Jayuya, Puerto Rico. The revolt, led by Blanca Canales, was one of the multiple revolts that occurred throughout Puerto Rico on that day against the Puerto Rican government supported by the United States. The Nationalists were opposed to U.S. sovereignty over Puerto Rico.

== Events leading to the revolt ==
The Puerto Rican Nationalist Party was formed in 1922 to work for Puerto Rican Independence. By 1930, Pedro Albizu Campos, a lawyer who was the first Puerto Rican graduate from Harvard Law School, was elected president of the party.

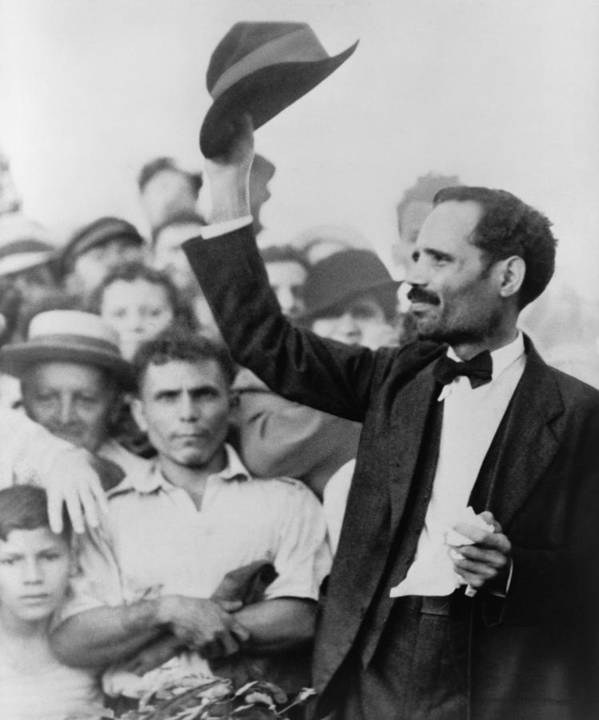
Don Pedro Albizu Campos, leader of the Puerto Rican Nationalist Party

In the 1930s, the United States-appointed governor of Puerto Rico, Blanton Winship, and the police colonel, a former U.S. Army Colonel named Elisha Francis Riggs, applied harsh repressive measures against the Nationalist Party. In 1936, Albizu Campos and the leaders of the party were arrested and jailed at the La Princesa prison in San Juan, and later sent to the Federal prison in Atlanta. On March 21, 1937, the police opened fire on the crowd at a Nationalist parade, killing 19 people in what came to be known as the Ponce massacre. Albizu Campos returned to Puerto Rico on December 15, 1947, after spending ten years in prison.}

On May 21, 1948, a bill was introduced before the Puerto Rican Senate which would restrain the rights of the independence and Nationalist movements on the archipelago. The Senate, controlled by the Partido Popular Democrático (PPD) and presided by Luis Muñoz Marín, approved the bill that day. This bill, which resembled the anti-communist Smith Act passed in the United States in 1940, became known as the Ley de la Mordaza (Gag Law) when the U.S.-appointed governor of Puerto Rico, Jesús T. Piñero, signed it into law on June 10, 1948.

Under this new law it would be a crime to print, publish, sell, or exhibit any material intended to paralyze or destroy the insular government; or to organize any society, group or assembly of people with a similar destructive intent. It made it illegal to sing a patriotic song, and reinforced the 1898 law that had made it illegal to display the Flag of Puerto Rico, with anyone found guilty of disobeying the law in any way being subject to a sentence of up to ten years imprisonment, a fine of up to US$10,000 (equivalent to $134,000 in 2025), or both.

According to Dr. Leopoldo Figueroa, a member of the Partido Estadista Puertorriqueño (Puerto Rican Statehood Party) and the only member of the Puerto Rico House of Representatives who was not a member of the PPD, the law was repressive and in violation of the First Amendment of the US Constitution guaranteeing Freedom of Speech. As such, the Law was seen as an assault on the civil rights of every Puerto Rican.

On June 21, 1948, Albizu Campos gave a speech in the town of Manatí that explained how this Gag Law violated the First Amendment of the U.S. Constitution. Nationalists from all over the island had gathered to hear Albizu Campos's speech and to prevent the police from arresting him.

== Uprising ==
From 1949 to 1950, the Nationalists in the island planned and prepared an armed revolution. The revolution was to take place in 1952, on the date the United States Congress was to officially approve the Estado Libre Associado ("Free Associated State") political status for Puerto Rico.

Albizu Campos called for an armed revolution because he considered the "new political status" to be a colonial farce. Albizu Campos picked the town of Jayuya as the headquarters of the revolution because of its location and because weapons were stored in the home of Blanca Canales.

On October 26, 1950, Albizu Campos was holding a meeting in Fajardo, when he received word that his house in San Juan was surrounded by police waiting to arrest him. He was told that the police had already arrested other Nationalist leaders. He escaped from Fajardo and ordered the revolution to start. On October 27, the police in the town of Peñuelas intercepted and fired upon a caravan of Nationalists, killing four.

On October 30, the Nationalists staged uprisings in the towns of Ponce, Mayagüez, Naranjito, Arecibo, Utuado (Utuado Uprising), San Juan (San Juan Nationalist revolt), and Jayuya.

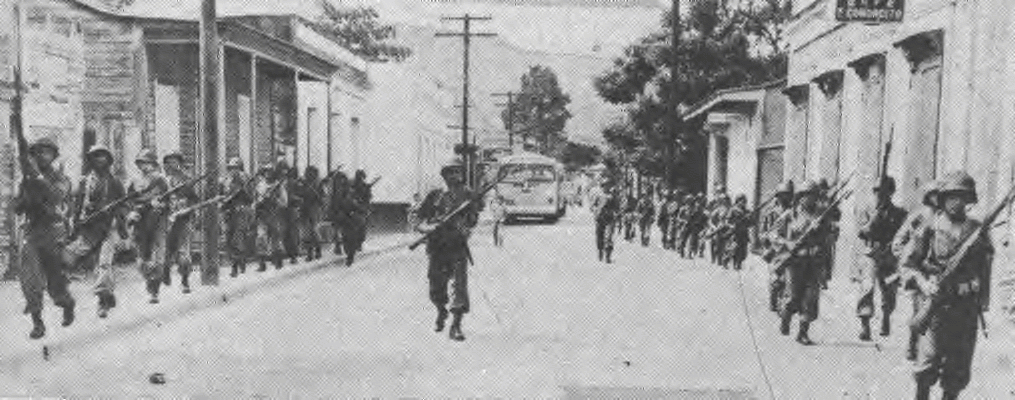
The 296th Infantry Regiment of the Puerto Rican National Guard occupy Jayuya

In the pre-dawn hours of October 29, the Insular Police surrounded the house of the mother of Melitón Muñiz Santos, president of the Peñuelas Nationalist Party, in Barrio Macaná, where they were storing weapons for the Nationalist revolt. Without warning, the police fired on the house and a gunfight ensued. Two Nationalists were killed and six police officers were wounded. Nationalists Melitón Muñoz Santos, Roberto Jaume Rodríguez, Estanislao Lugo Santiago, Marcelino Turell, William Gutierrez and Marcelino Berríos were arrested and accused of participating in an ambush against the local Insular Police.

Members of the Nationalist Party had stored weapons in Canales's house in Jayuya. Canales and the other leaders, including her cousin Elio Torresola and Carlos Irizarry, led the armed Nationalists into the town and invaded the police station. Shots were fired, one officer was killed, three were wounded, and the other officers surrendered. The Nationalists cut the telephone lines and burned the U.S. post office. Canales led the group into the town square where, in defiance of the Ley de la Mordaza (Gag Law), they raised the Flag of Puerto Rico. In the town square, Canales declared Puerto Rico a free Republic. Torresola had a brother, Griselio Torresola, living in New York City, who was outraged by the attacks.

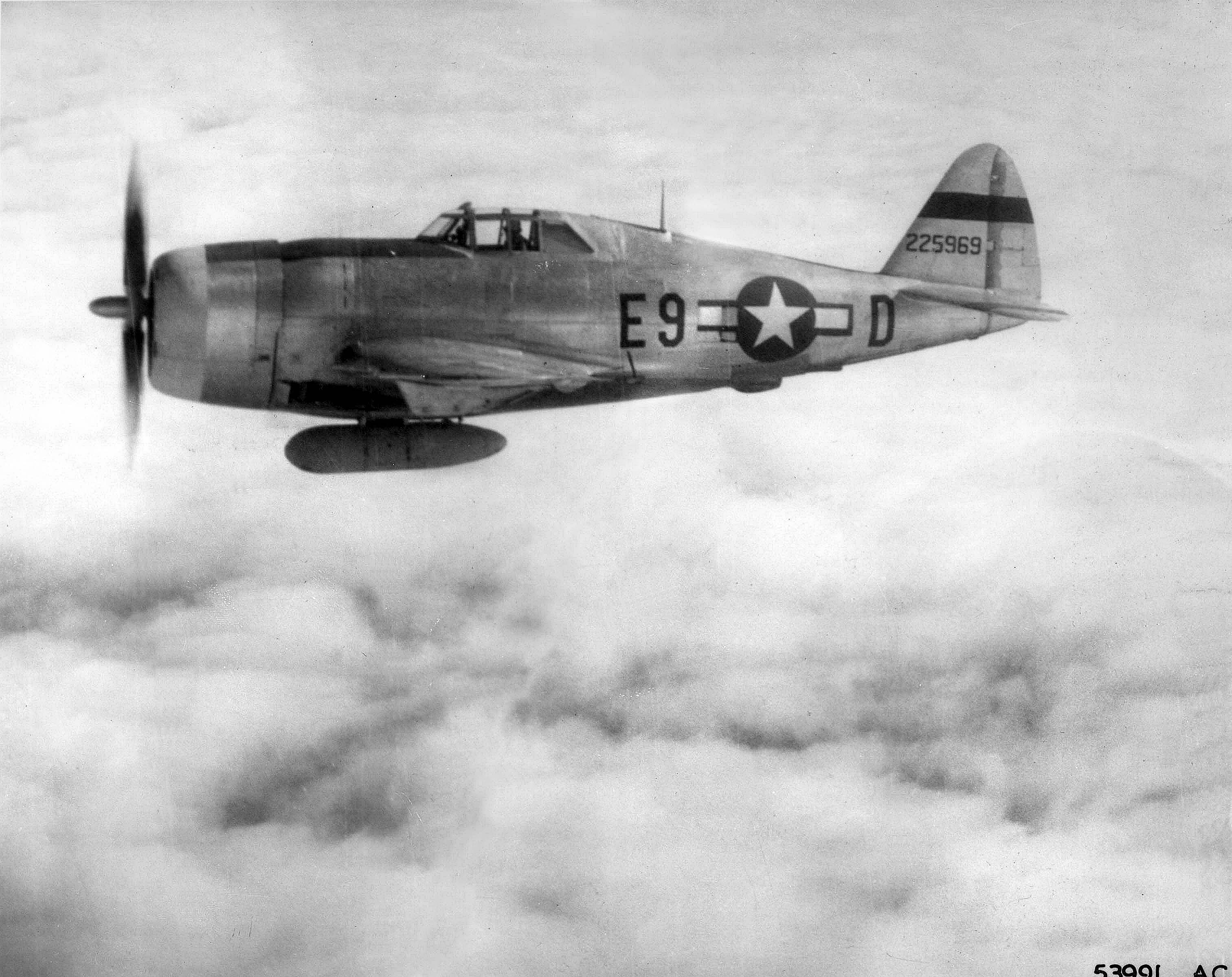
A P-47 Thunderbolt, the aircraft type employed to bomb Jayuya and Utuado

The governor, Luis Muñoz Marín, declared martial law. The United States sent ten P-47 Thunderbolt fighter planes out of Ramey Air Force Base to bomb the town of Jayuya. American infantry troops and the Puerto Rico National Guard, under the command of the Puerto Rico Adjutant General, Major General Luis R. Esteves, used P-47 Thunderbolt attack aircraft, land-based artillery, mortar fire, and grenades to counterattack the Nationalists. The planes dropped 500-pound bombs and machine-gunned nearly every rooftop in the town, leaving the town in ruins.

Although an extensive part of Jayuya was destroyed, news of the military action was prevented from spreading outside of Puerto Rico. Instead, the American media reported President Truman saying it was "an incident between Puerto Ricans."

Nationalists in New York City as well as Puerto Rico were outraged by the counterattack. Griselio Torresola and Oscar Collazo, among other Nationalists in the city, made a quick plan to assassinate the U.S. president, Harry S. Truman. He was reported as staying at Blair House while the living quarters of the White House were under renovation. After traveling south by train, on November 1, 1950, they attacked guards at the Blair House, seeking to gain entry. Torresola and White House police officer Leslie Coffelt were killed in the attempt; Collazo and two American officers were wounded.

After the Nationalists were forced to surrender, the Puerto Rican government arrested thousands of people supporting independence. According to police estimates, 28 people were killed and 50 were wounded in the uprising, including in Jayuya and elsewhere in Puerto Rico. 16 Nationalists, 8 police officers and soldiers, and 4 civilians were killed.

Some attempt to frame the events as if the Puerto Ricans bombed themselves (Luis Ferrao). Nelson Denis refutes this: "The P-47 fighter planes that bombed Utuado and Jayuya were built in the US, hangared in US airfields, maintained with US equipment, flown by US-trained pilots who dropped US-made bombs, and all of it – the planes, the airfield, the pilots, the bombs – were financed by the US. Yet Ferrao would have us believe that a decal saying “Air National Guard” means that Puerto Rico bombed itself."

== Aftermath ==
External audio
- Newsreel scenes in Spanish of the Puerto Rican Nationalist Party Revolts of the 1950s here

The top leaders of the Nationalist party were arrested, including Albizu Campos and Blanca Canales, and sent to jail to serve long prison terms. Oscar Collazo was convicted of murder in the US and sentenced to death. U.S. President Truman commuted his sentence to life. In 1979 President Carter commuted Collazo's sentence to time served and he returned to Puerto Rico. The city of Jayuya converted the Blanca Canales home into a historical museum.

The last major attempt by the Puerto Rican Nationalist Party to draw world attention to Puerto Rico's colonial situation occurred on March 1, 1954, when nationalist leader Lolita Lebrón, together with fellow nationalists Rafael Cancel Miranda, Irvin Flores and Andres Figueroa Cordero, attacked members of the United States House of Representatives, shooting from the gallery and wounding several members. Lebrón and her comrades were charged with attempted murder and other crimes.

== Gallery ==
Jayuya Uprising Monuments
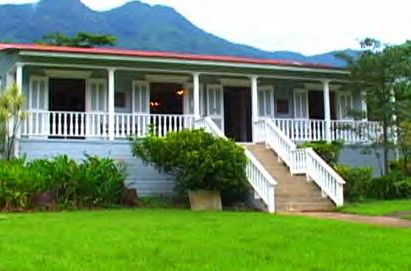
The House of Nemesio and Blanca Canales

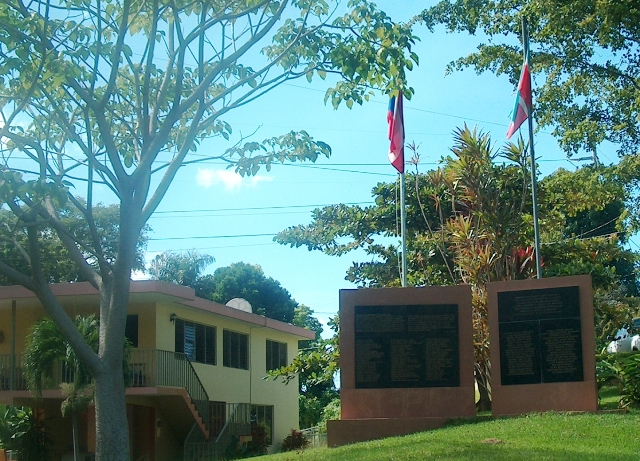
Monument to the Jayuya Uprising participants in Mayagüez, Puerto Rico

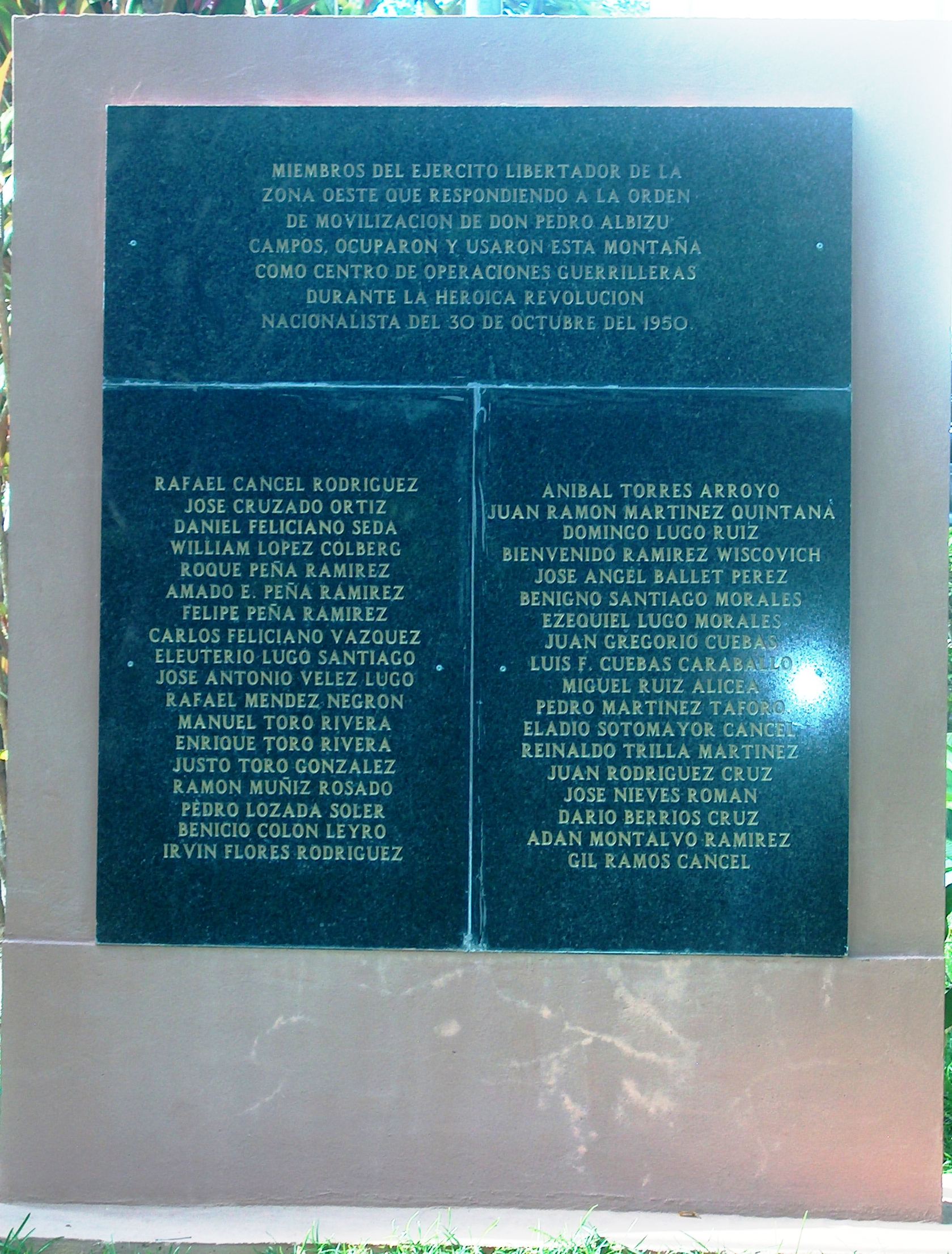
Plaque honoring the male participants of the 1950 Jayuya Uprising

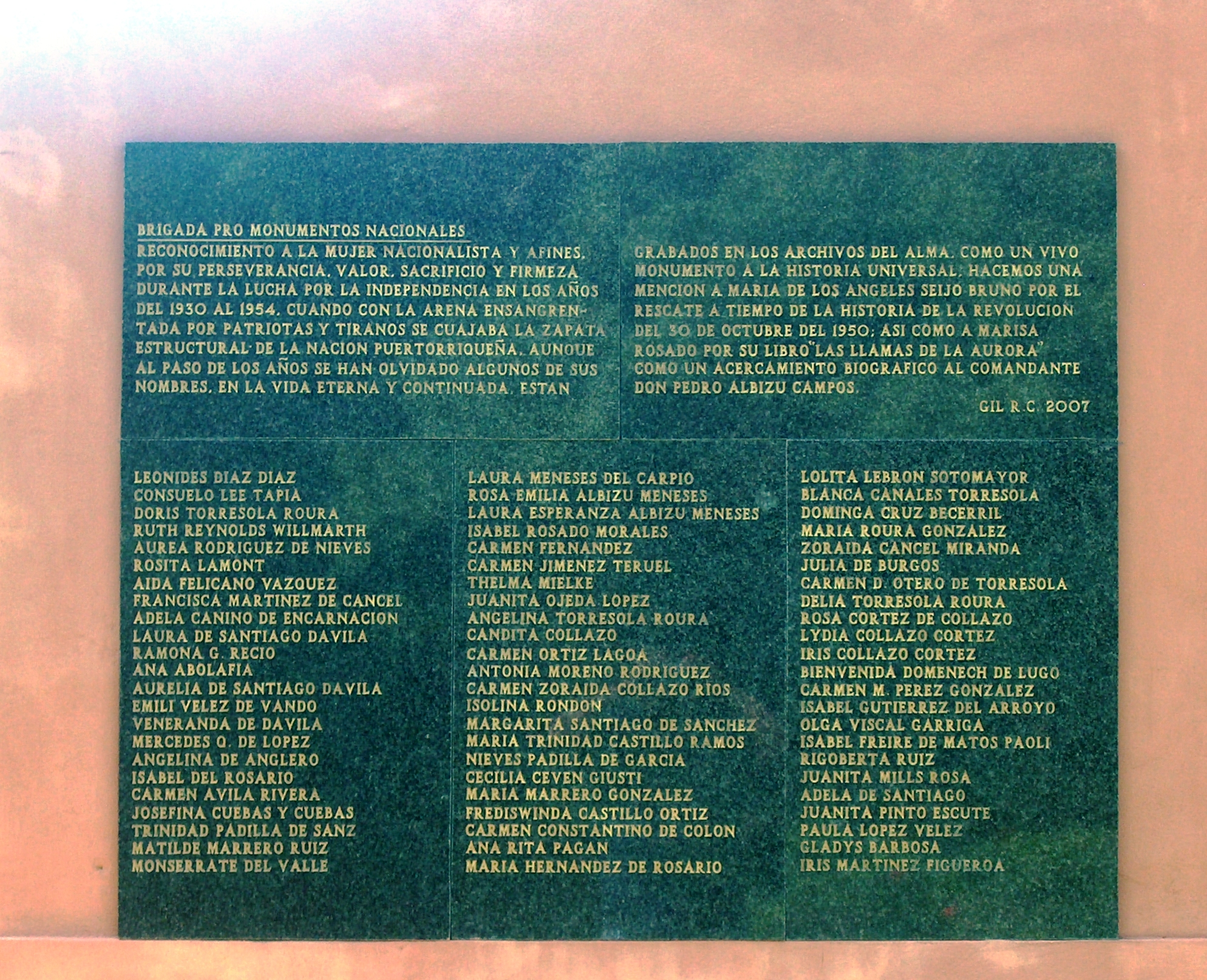
Plaque honoring the female participants of the 1950 Jayuya Uprising

== See also ==
- Puerto Rican Nationalist Party
- Ducoudray Holstein Expedition
- Grito de Lares
- Intentona de Yauco
- Río Piedras massacre
- Ponce massacre
- Puerto Rican Nationalist Party Revolts of the 1950s
- Utuado uprising
- San Juan Nationalist revolt
- Puerto Rican Independence Party
- List of Puerto Ricans
- Truman assassination attempt
