= Oranda, Virginia =

Unincorporated community in Virginia, US

Coordinates: 39°01′39″N 78°20′00″W

Oranda is an unincorporated community in Shenandoah County, Virginia, United States. At one time Oranda had a general store located on the corner of Clary Road and Oranda Road. The community was also home to a women's college located on Old Factory Road. Children in the community attended the Oranda school house from its construction in 1894 until the mid-1950s.

== Notable people ==
- Leslie Coffelt, a Washington D.C. police officer who died protecting President Harry S. Truman during an assassination attempt
