= 1952 Puerto Rican constitutional referendum =

- 3 March 1952

Results
Choice	Votes	%
Yes	374,649	81.88%
No	82,923	18.12%

A referendum on a new constitution was held in Puerto Rico on 3 March 1952. It was approved by 82% of voters. This was considered by many American and Puerto Rican politicians an affirmation of the new constitution of the archipelago and island as an Estado Libre Asociado, or Commonwealth, as proposed by legislation in 1950 by the United States Congress after negotiation with its political leaders. Puerto Rican nationalists question the meaning of the referendum, complaining that the only alternative offered was direct U.S. rule, and no choice of independence was offered. In 1980, the Supreme Court of the United States adjudicated (Harris v. Rosario) that as a result of this referendum of 1952, the actual territorial status was not changed at all.

On 1 November 1950 two Puerto Rican Nationalists had attempted assassinating American president Harry S. Truman. They claimed they were retaliating for U.S. cooperation in repressing the 1950 nationalist revolts on the island. Truman's stated motive for supporting the plebiscite was that residents of the island could express their opinion of preferred status, but since independence was not offered, nationalists questioned Truman's stated motive. An overwhelming majority approved the commonwealth over the alternative of return to direct American rule.

== Results ==
Choice	Votes	%
For	374,649	81.88
Against	82,923	18.12
Total	457,572	100.00
Registered voters/turnout	781,914	–
Source: Nohlen
