= Puerto Rican Nationalist Party insurgency =

Armed pro-independence protests

- Part of political violence in the United States during the Cold War
Date	October 30, 1950 – March 1, 1954
Location	Puerto Rico and Washington, D.C.
Result	United States victory: Uprising suppressed

Belligerents
Puerto Rican Nationalist Party; Cadets of the Republic	United States; Puerto Rico National Guard

Commanders and leaders
Pedro Albizu Campos; Juan Antonio Corretjer; Francisco Matos Paoli; Vidal Santiago Díaz; Raimundo Pacheco; Blanca Canales	Luis Muñoz Marín; Luis R. Esteves

Casualties and losses
16 killed 9 wounded	8 killed 29 wounded
- 4 civilians killed 11 wounded
- Additional PRNP paramilitary cells in Washington, D.C.

The Puerto Rican Nationalist Party insurgency was a series of coordinated uprisings for the secession of Puerto Rico led by the president of the Puerto Rican Nationalist Party, Don Pedro Albizu Campos, against the United States government's rule over the islands of Puerto Rico. The party repudiated the "Free Associated State" (Estado Libre Asociado) status that had been enacted in 1950 and which the Nationalists considered a continuation of colonialism.

The party organized a series of uprisings to take place in various Puerto Rican cities on October 30, 1950. The uprisings were suppressed by strong ground and air military force, including forces of the U.S. military, under the command of Puerto Rico National Guard Major General Luis R. Esteves. In a related event, on November 1 of that year, two Nationalists from New York City attempted to storm the Blair House in a failed effort to assassinate U.S. President Harry S. Truman, who supported the Puerto Rican government effort to draft a constitution that would rename the local government as a commonwealth of the United States and provide some limited local autonomy.

In 1952, nearly 82% of Puerto Rican voters approved the Constitution of the Estado Libre Associado. But the Nationalists considered the outcome of the vote a political farce since the referendum offered no option to vote in favor of independence or statehood, restricting the choices to only two: a continuation of the colonial status existing at that time and the proposed new commonwealth status.

On March 1, 1954, in another armed assault, four Nationalists fired shots from the visitors' gallery in the House of Representatives of the United States Capitol during a full floor debate, wounding five Congressmen, one seriously. The Nationalists were protesting what they perceived as a continuation of a colonial status in Puerto Rico.

== Historical context ==
=== Spanish Colony, Carta de Autonomía, US Possession ===
After 400 years of colonial domination under the Spanish Empire, Puerto Rico received sovereignty in 1898 through a Carta de Autonomía (Charter of Autonomy). This Charter of Autonomy was signed by the Spanish Prime Minister Práxedes Mateo Sagasta and ratified by the Spanish Cortes. However, at the conclusion of the Spanish–American War, it was still the age of imperialism and Manifest Destiny. The United States claimed rule over the island under the Treaty of Paris, and the US demanded cessions from its defeated foe, Spain. The Puerto Rican Nationalist Party arose among opponents to this action, who said that, as a matter of international law, the Treaty of Paris could not empower the Spanish to give what was no longer theirs. The US administered Puerto Rico as a territory, initially with a military government.

In 1901, the first civilian U.S. governor of Puerto Rico, Charles Herbert Allen, became the president of the largest sugar-refining company in the world, the American Sugar Refining Company, which also dominated Puerto Rico's economy. This company was later renamed as the Domino Sugar company. In effect, Charles Allen leveraged his governorship of Puerto Rico into a controlling interest over the entire Puerto Rican economy.

The federal government did not quite know how to classify Puerto Ricans at first. In 1904, the Immigration Service implemented more strict regulations that classified people from Puerto Rico as aliens who tried to enter the US, although previously they had easily migrated. In a case carried to the US Supreme Court by Isabel González in 1904, the court ruled that Puerto Ricans had the right of free travel to the US. In 1917, the US granted full US citizenship to residents of Puerto Rico just before sending Puerto Rican men to fight for the US in World War I; however, Puerto Ricans were restricted from voting in presidential elections because Puerto Rico did not have the status of a state.

=== United States "Manifest Destiny" and the banana republics ===
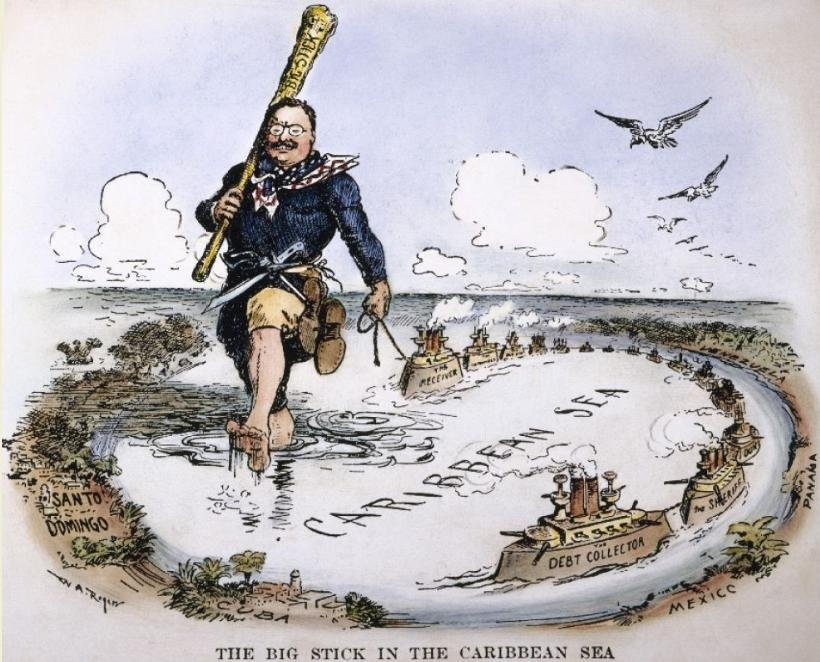

The U.S. government supported expansion of its interests throughout Latin America.

In 1912 the Cuyamel Banana company, a U.S. corporation, orchestrated the military invasion of Honduras in order to obtain hundreds of thousands of acres of Honduran land, and tax-free export of its entire banana crop. By 1928 the United Fruit Company, another U.S. corporation, owned over 200,000 acres of prime Colombian farmland. When a labor strike erupted against the company in December 6 of that year, over one thousand men, women and children were shot and killed in order to "settle" the strike. This was known as the Banana Massacre.

By 1930 the United Fruit Company owned over one million acres of land in Guatemala, Honduras, Colombia, Panama, Nicaragua, Costa Rica, Mexico and Cuba. By 1940, in Honduras alone, the United Fruit Company owned 50 percent of all private land in the entire country. By 1942, the United Fruit Company owned 75 percent of all private land in Guatemala - plus most of Guatemala's roads, power stations and phone lines, the only Pacific seaport, and every mile of railroad.

By 1930, over 40 percent of all the arable land in Puerto Rico had been converted into sugar plantations, which were entirely owned by former governor Charles Allen and U.S. banking interests. These bank syndicates also owned the entire coastal railroad, and the San Juan international seaport.

=== Puerto Rican Nationalist Party ===
External videos
- Newsreel scenes of the Ponce massacre

There had been a push to seeking independence from the United States from the earliest days of US rule. From the many groups and parties that existed in the first two decades after the Treaty of Paris, the Puerto Rican Nationalist Party emerged as the main affiliation. First organized on September 17, 1922, the Nationalist Party's main objective was Puerto Rican Independence. By 1930, disagreements between Jose Coll y Cuchi and Pedro Albizu Campos as to how the party should be run, led the former and his followers to abandon the party.

On May 11, 1930, Albizu Campos was elected president of the Nationalist Party. Social unrest increased during the Great Depression, and the party became the largest independence movement in Puerto Rico. In the mid-1930s, the Nationalist movement gained support after the Río Piedras and the Ponce massacres; they said the US-supported government resorted to violence to maintain its colonial regime in Puerto Rico.

After disappointing electoral results, the two massacres and continued strong repression by the territorial police authorities, by the mid-1930s Albizu opted against electoral participation, and advocated violent revolution.

== Lead up to October 1950 ==
From mid-1948 to mid-1950, the efforts of the US government to control the political future of Puerto Rico, denying a voice for independence, were escalated through a law signed by the US-appointed territorial governor in June 1948 and a law signed by the US president in July 1950.

=== Puerto Rico's Gag Law (Ley de la Mordaza) ===
On May 21, 1948, a bill had been introduced before the Puerto Rican Senate which, in the opinion of Leopoldo Figueroa, then a member of the Puerto Rico House of Representatives, violated the civil rights of Puerto Ricans to the protection of the First Amendment of the US Constitution, which guarantees Freedom of Speech. The Senate, which at the time was controlled by the Partido Popular Democrático (PPD) and presided by Luis Muñoz Marín, approved the bill. This bill became known as the Ley de la Mordaza (Gag Law, technically "Law 53 of 1948") when the U.S.-appointed governor of Puerto Rico, Jesús T. Piñero, signed it into law on June 10, 1948.

The Gag Law made it a crime to print, publish, sell, or exhibit any material intended to paralyze or destroy the insular government; or to organize any society, group or assembly of people with a similar destructive intent. It made it illegal to sing a patriotic song, and reinforced the 1898 law that had made it illegal to display the Flag of Puerto Rico, with anyone found guilty of disobeying the law in any way being subject to a sentence of up to ten years imprisonment, a fine of up to US$10,000 (equivalent to $134,000 in 2025), or both, for each offense.

=== Puerto Rico Federal Relations Act of 1950 ===
On July 3, 1950, President Harry Truman signed into law the Puerto Rico Federal Relations Act of 1950, as passed by the 81st United States Congress. The law authorized a new status for Puerto Rico, as a "Free Associated State" (Estado Libre Asociado). It provided for popular elections of the governor, a bicameral legislature and bill of rights, and executive functions similar to those of the states. The US was to keep control over the money, defense, customs, and any foreign treaties. The Nationalists considered this a continuation of colonialism.

== Revolts and events of 1950 ==
The front page of El Imparcial on October 31, 1950, announced "rebellion on the island".

External audio
- Newsreel scenes in Spanish of the Puerto Rican Nationalist Party Revolts of the 1950s
- Newsreel scenes in English of the assassination attempt on U.S. President Harry S Truman

The Puerto Rican Nationalist Party uprisings were a repudiation of the "Free Associated State" designation of Puerto Rico - a designation they regarded as a colonial farce. They were a call for independence from US rule, demanding the recognition of the 1898 Charter of Autonomy, and Puerto Rico's international sovereignty.

The uprisings began on October 30, 1950, upon the orders of Pedro Albizu Campos, president of the Nationalist Party. Uprisings occurred in Peñuelas, Mayagüez, Naranjito, Arecibo and Ponce. The most notable rebellions occurred in Utuado, Jayuya, and San Juan, Puerto Rico.

The revolts were not limited to Puerto Rico. They included a plot to assassinate the President of the United States Harry S. Truman. On November 1, 1950, two Nationalists attacked the Blair House in Washington, D.C., where Truman was staying while renovations were being made to the White House.

The last major attempt by the Puerto Rican Nationalist Party to draw world attention to Puerto Rico's situation occurred on March 1, 1954, when four Nationalists attacked the United States House of Representatives.

=== Peñuelas Incident ===
The first incident of the Nationalist uprisings was an act by a police force against the rebels, in the pre-dawn hours of October 29, 1950. The Insular Police of the town of Peñuelas surrounded the house of Melitón Muñiz Santos's mother. Melitón Muñiz Santos was the president of the Peñuelas Nationalist Party in the barrio Macaná, and the police were about to raid the house that Muñiz Santos was using as distribution center for weapons for the Nationalist Revolt. Without warning, the police fired on the Nationalists in the house. A firefight ensued, killing three Nationalists (Arturo Ortiz, Guillermo González Ubides, José A. Ramos) and wounding six police officers. Nationalists Meliton Muñoz Santos, Roberto Jaume Rodriguez, Estanislao Lugo Santiago, Marcelino Turell, William Gutirrez and Marcelino Berrios were arrested and accused of participating in an ambush against the local Insular Police.

=== Arecibo Incident ===
Tomás López de Victoria, Sub-Commander of the Cadets of the Republic, led the revolt in Arecibo. He ordered Ismael Díaz Matos to attack the local police station. Díaz Matos killed four policemen before fleeing. Fellow Nationalist Hipólito Miranda Díaz was killed while he covered the escape of his comrades. Díaz Matos and his group were captured and arrested by the National Guard. Among the Cadets arrested and charged with organizing the attack were López de Victoria and Juan Jaca Hernández, Cadet Captain of Arecibo.

=== Ponce Incident ===
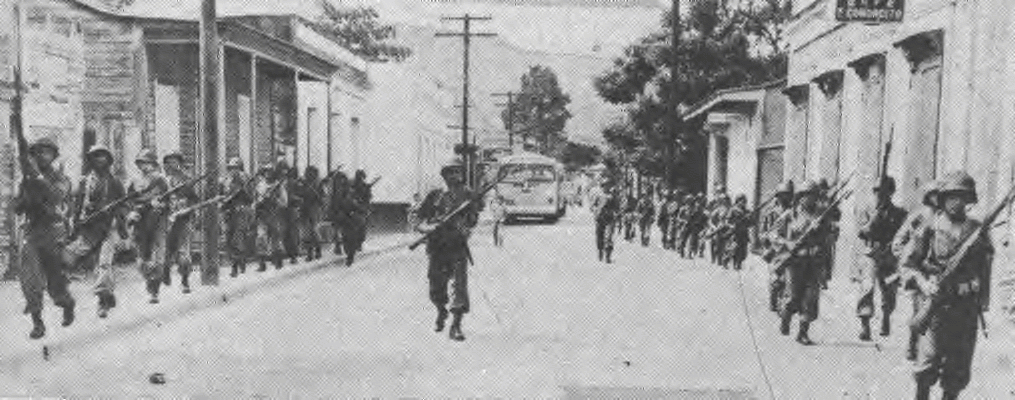
The 296th Infantry Regiment of the U.S.-backed Puerto Rico National Guard occupy the town of Jayuya

Police Corporal Aurelio Miranda approached a car carrying some Nationalists. Fellow officers suggested they arrest them. Officer Miranda was shot dead in a gunfight between the Nationalists and the police. Antonio Alicea, Jose Miguel Alicea, Francisco Campos (Albizu Campos' nephew), Osvaldo Perez Martinez, and Ramon Pedrosa Rivera were arrested and accused of the murder of police Corporal Miranda. Raul de Jesus was accused of violation of the Insular Firearms Law.

=== Mayagüez Incident ===
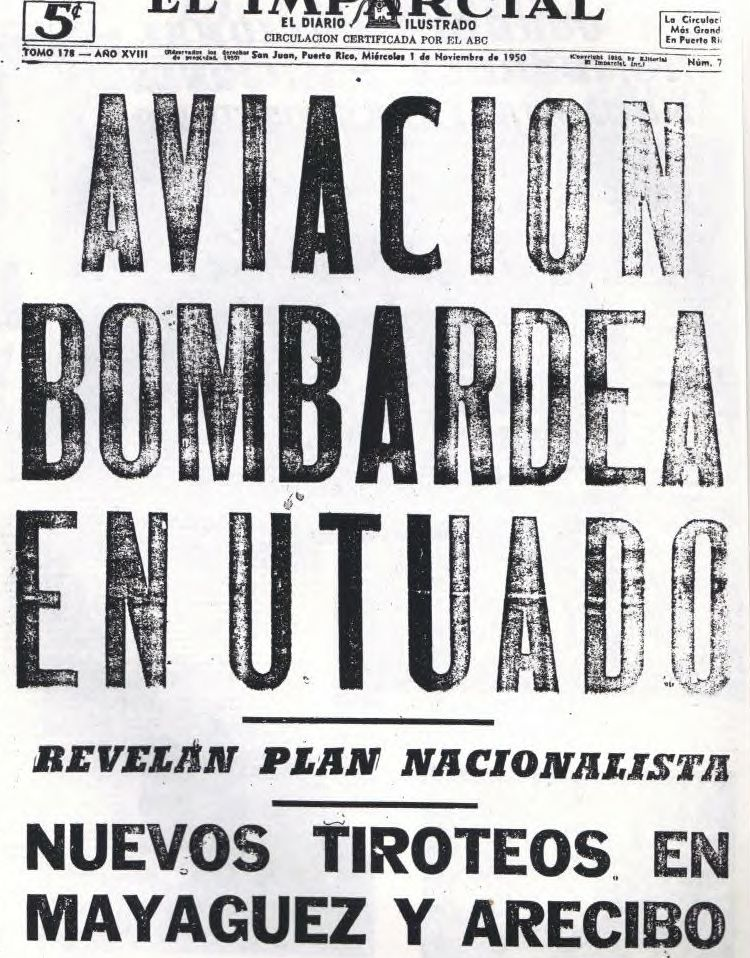
El Imparcial headline: "Aviation bombing in Utuado"

The Nationalist group of Mayagüez was one of the largest. It was divided into several units, each assigned to attack different targets. One of the groups attacked the town's police station, resulting in the death of three policemen and three bystanders. This unit joined the others in Barrio La Quinta. After local police arrived, the men escaped into the forests and mountains and avoided further casualties by using guerrilla tactics. One of the members of these units was Nationalist cadet Irvin Flores Rodríguez, who on March 1, 1954, together with Lolita Lebrón, Rafael Cancel Miranda and Andres Figueroa Cordero, attacked the members of the US House of Representatives in Washington, DC with automatic pistols.

=== Jayuya Uprising ===
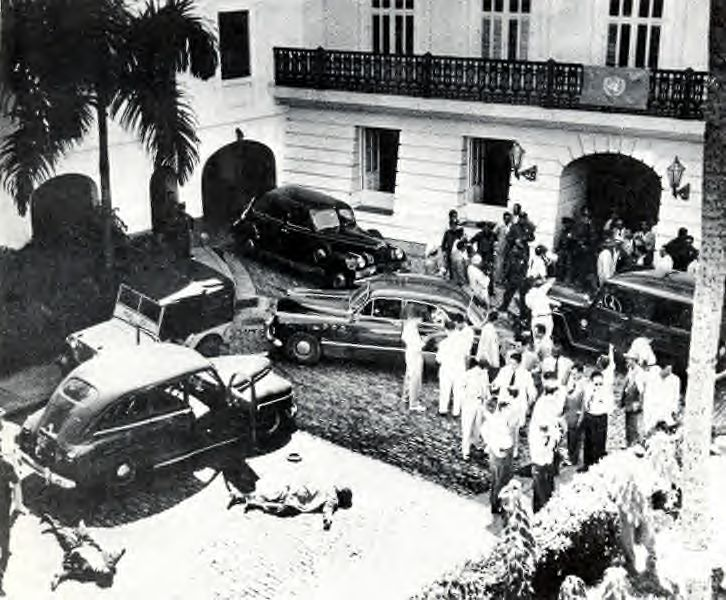
The bodies of Nationalists Carlos Hiraldo Resto and Manuel Torres Medina lie on the ground in San Juan

The Jayuya Uprising was a revolt in the town of Jayuya, Puerto Rico, which occurred on October 30, 1950. The revolt, led by Blanca Canales, was one of the most notable among the various revolts which occurred that day against the island's US-supported government. In the town square, Canales gave a speech and declared Puerto Rico a free Republic. Under the direction of the Puerto Rico commander of the U.S.-backed Puerto Rico National Guard, the town was attacked by US-supplied planes and artillery. The town was held by the Nationalists for three days.

=== Utuado Uprising ===
The Utuado Uprising was a revolt that occurred in Utuado as part of a series of uprising. Nationalists, led by the captain of the Utuado branch of the Cadets of the Republic, attacked the police station. The U.S.-backed National Guard arrived that day and ordered the nine surviving Nationalists to surrender. They were marched to the town plaza and required to remove their shoes, belts and personal belongings. Taken behind the police station, the men were machine gunned by the national guardsmen. Five men died: Heriberto Castro, Julio Colón Feliciano, Agustín Quiñones Mercado, Antonio Ramos and Antonio González. The four survivors were seriously wounded. The event became known as "La Masacre de Utuado" (The Utuado Massacre). Over the next two days, the Puerto Rican military commander used U.S.-supplied P-47 Thunderbolt fighter planes to bomb Utuado.

=== San Juan Nationalist revolt ===
The rebels also attacked the capital of Puerto Rico, San Juan, in the San Juan Nationalist revolt, on October 30, 1950. The San Juan uprising's main objective was to attack "La Fortaleza" (the governor's mansion) and the United States Federal Court House Building in Old San Juan. Four Nationalists died during the attempt: Raimundo Díaz Pacheco, Domingo Hiraldo Resto, Carlos Hiraldo Resto and Manuel Torres Medina. In the incident known as the Gunfight at Salon Boricua, Vidal Santiago Díaz, Albizu Campos' barber, was attacked by 40 police officers and guardsmen. The incident happened at Santiago Díaz's barbershop, "Salon Boricua", located in the Santurce neighborhood of San Juan. The gunfight was broadcast live over the radio to the Puerto Rican public.

=== Naranjito Incident ===
José Antonio Negrón, a World War II veteran, led the revolt in Naranjito and Nationalists who attacked the police. Afterward, they retreated to the nearby forests and mountains and formed a guerrilla group. They continued to raid several locations until November 6, when the National Guard arrived and attacked the house where the group was staying. Negrón escaped to Corozal, where he was arrested on November 10. The Nationalist uprising in Puerto Rico ended at Naranjito.

=== Truman assassination attempt ===
The revolt included the Truman assassination attempt, a failed attempt on the life of U.S. President Harry Truman, on November 1, 1950. Oscar Collazo and Griselio Torresola, from New York, carried out the attack on Blair House, where President Harry Truman was living during renovations at the White House. In the firefight between the Nationalists and police and Secret Service officers, Torresola mortally wounded a White House Police officer, who killed him in return shooting. Collazo was wounded and stood trial; convicted, he was sentenced to death, but Truman commuted his sentence to life. Truman supported the Puerto Rican effort to draft and vote on a constitution for the island's government which would establish the islands' political status. In March 1952, the people of Puerto Rico voted overwhelmingly, nearly 82%, in favor of the new constitution establishing the Commonwealth.

== Outcome and continued actions in 1950s ==
=== Outcome of the 1950 revolts ===
The revolts resulted in many casualties: of the 28 dead, 16 were Nationalists, 7 were police officers, one a National Guardsman, and 4 were civilians. Of the 49 wounded, 23 were police officers, 6 were National Guardsmen, 9 were Nationalists, and 11 were civilians.

The revolt of October 1950 failed because of the overwhelming force used by the U.S.-backed Puerto Rico National Guard (the 296th Regiment of the United States National Guard), the FBI, the CIA, and the Puerto Rican Insular Police, all of whom were aligned against the Nationalists. Dozens of Nationalists were killed and wounded, and hundreds of others were arrested and held in prison.

The U.S.-backed Puerto Rico National Guard had also bombed the towns of Jayuya and Utuado. Critics have said that there was not sufficient coverage of the suppression of the uprisings. According to an anonymous and undated article in the New York Latino Journal in the early 2000s, it was described at the time in the mainland press as an "incident between Puerto Ricans."

After the assassination attempt against him in 1950, Truman pushed for a "status referendum" and accompanying "constitution." In a March 1952 vote, nearly 82% of voters in Puerto Rico approved the constitution. This result was controversial, since the referendum had only offered a choice between the existing colony or commonwealth, and neither independence nor statehood were on the ballot.

=== 1954 U.S. Capitol shooting incident ===
On March 1, 1954, the Nationalists attacked the House of Representatives. Four Puerto Rican Nationalists: Lolita Lebrón, Rafael Cancel Miranda, Andres Figueroa Cordero, and Irvin Flores Rodríguez, tried to highlight problems in Puerto Rico by attacking the House of Representatives of the United States. They fired automatic pistols from the Ladies' Gallery (a balcony for visitors) in the House of Representatives. The 240 representatives were on the floor during a debate over an immigration bill. They wounded five Congressmen, one seriously, but all survived. All four attackers were tried and convicted in federal court and sentenced to long terms of imprisonment. In 1978 and 1979, President Jimmy Carter commuted their sentences to time served, and the four returned to Puerto Rico.

=== Continued repression of independence movement ===
Among the factors which has affected the independence movement in Puerto Rico have been the "COINTELPRO program" and the "Carpetas program." The "COINTELPRO program" was a project conducted by the United States Federal Bureau of Investigation (FBI), under J. Edgar Hoover, aimed at surveying, infiltrating, discrediting, and disrupting certain domestic political organizations, including the independence movement in Puerto Rico. The "Carpetas program" was a massive collection of information gathered by the island's police on so called "political subversives." The police had in its possession thousands of extensive files (carpetas) concerning individuals of all social groups and ages. Approximately 75,000 persons were listed as under political police surveillance. The massive surveillance apparatus was aimed primarily against Puerto Rico's independence movement. Thus many independence supporters moved to the Popular Democratic Party as a means to an end to stop statehood.

== Notable Nationalist leaders of the 1950s ==
1. Pedro Albizu Campos - Party president.
2. Alvaro Rivera Walker - Secretary to Albizu Campos.
3. Juan Antonio Corretjer - 1st Secretary General of the Nationalist Party.
4. Francisco Matos Paoli - 2nd Secretary General of the Nationalist Party.
5. Vidal Santiago Díaz - President of the Santurce Municipal Board of the PRNP.
6. Raimundo Díaz Pacheco - Treasurer General of the Nationalist Party, Commander of the Cadets of the Republic and leader of the San Juan Nationalist revolt.
7. Tomás López de Victoria - Sub-Commander of the Cadets of the Republic and leader of the Arecibo Incident.
8. Olga Viscal Garriga - Student leader and spokesperson of the Puerto Rican Nationalist Party's branch in Rio Piedras.
9. Blanca Canales - Jayuya Uprising leader.
10. Heriberto Castro - Captain of the Utuado branch of the Cadets of the Republic.
11. Rosa Collazo - Treasurer of the New York branch of the Nationalist Party.
12. Melitón Muñiz Santos - President of the Peñuelas branch of the Nationalist Party and leader of the Peñuelas Incident.
13. José Antonio Negrón - Leader of the Naranjito Incident.
14. Carlos Vélez Rieckehoff - Leader of the Vieques branch of the Nationalist Party.
15. Hugo Margenat - Founder of "Acción Juventud Independentista" (Pro-independence Youth Action) and the "Federación de Universitarios Pro Independencia" (Federation of Pro-independence University Students).
16. Ruth Mary Reynolds - Founder of "Americans for Puerto Rico's Independence".
17. Damián Torres - Led the Utuado Uprising with Heriberto Castro.

Attempt against President Truman

1. Oscar Collazo - President of the New York branch of the Nationalist Party.
2. Griselio Torresola - Cousin of Blanca Canales who teamed up with Oscar Collazo in the assassination attempt.

U.S. Capitol shooting incident

1. Lolita Lebrón - Leader of the attack against the U.S. Capitol in 1954.
2. Rafael Cancel Miranda - Participant in the attack against the U.S. Capitol in 1954
3. Irvin Flores - Participant in the attack against the U.S. Capitol in 1954
4. Andres Figueroa Cordero - Participant in the attack against the U.S. Capitol in 1954

== Photo gallery ==
Gallery of Puerto Rican Nationalist Party leaders of the 1950s
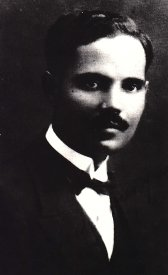
Pedro Albizu Campos

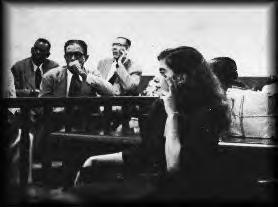
Olga Viscal Garriga

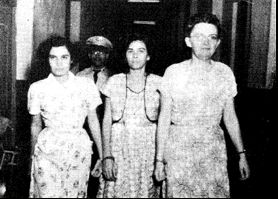
(L to R) Nationalists Carmen María Pérez Gonzalez, Olga Viscal Garriga and Ruth Mary Reynolds

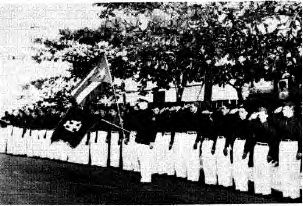
Raimundo Díaz Pacheco commanding the Cadets of the Republic
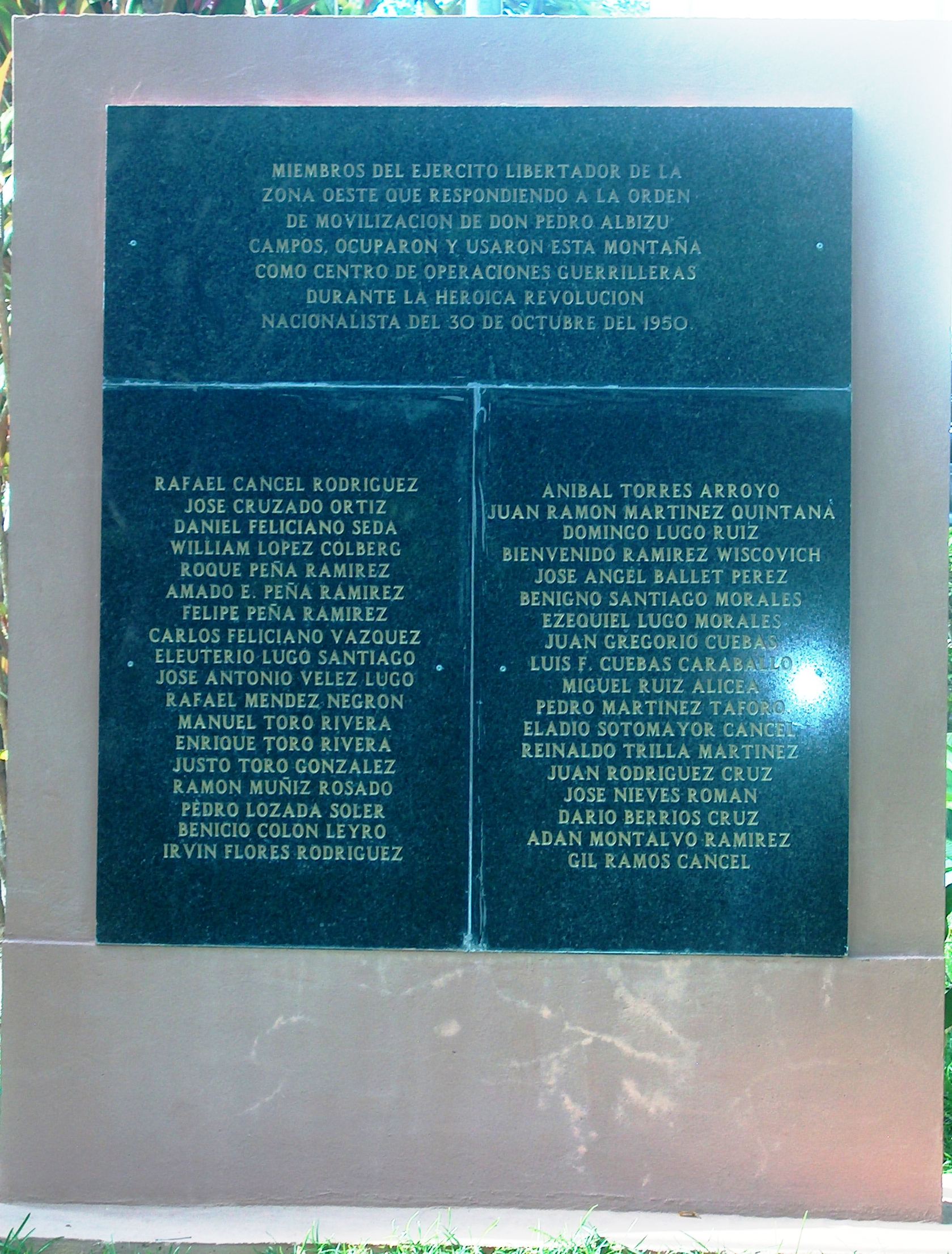
Plaque in honor of the male participants of the 1950 Jayuya Uprising

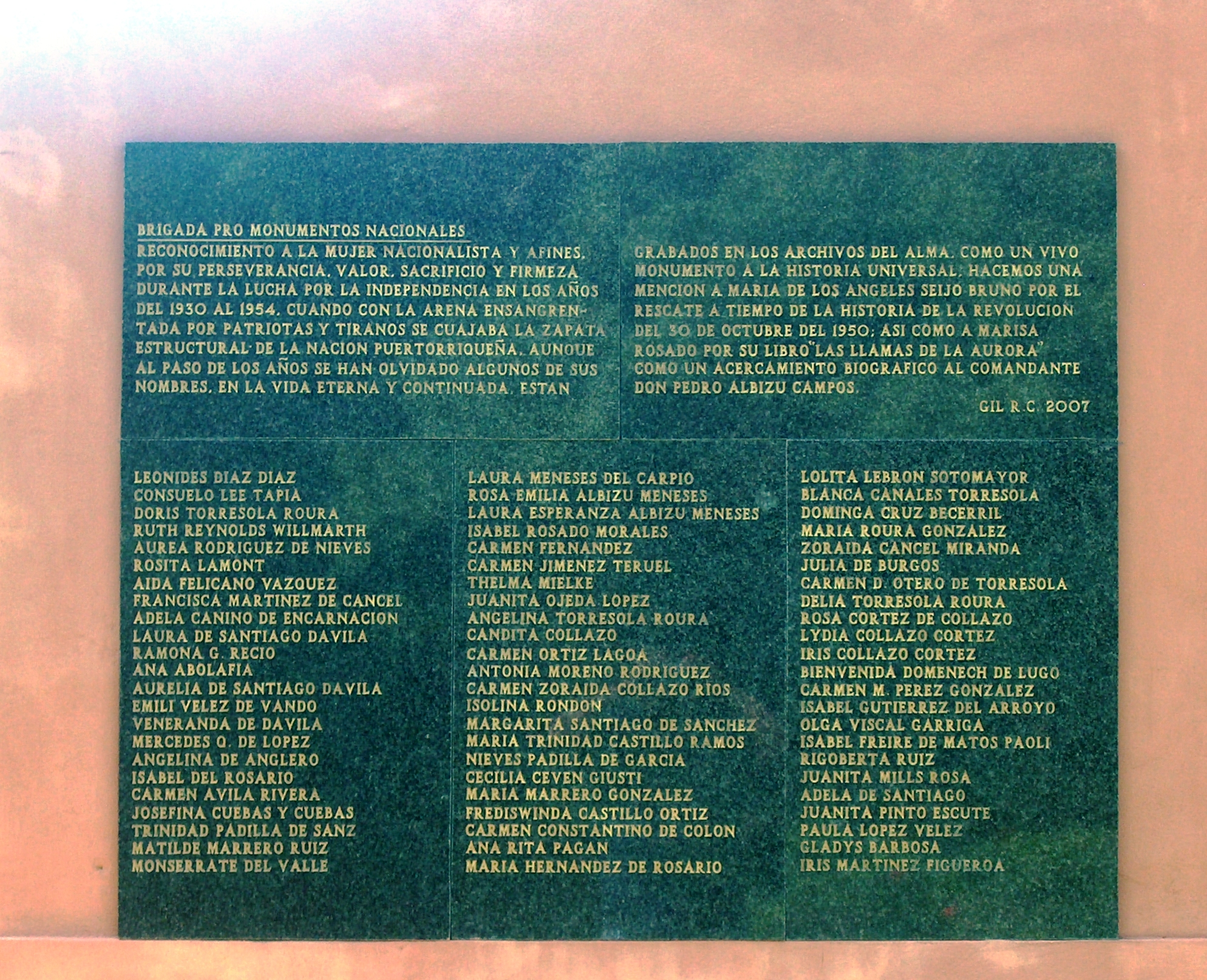
Plaque honoring the women of the Puerto Rican Nationalist Party

== Mundo Abierto (Open World) ==
"Mundo Abierto " (Open World) is a poem written in 1956 by Hugo Margenat, in which he refers to the bombardment of the town of Jayuya by the U.S.-backed Puerto Rico National Guard. This occurred during the Jayuya Uprising, which was headed by Nationalist leader Blanca Canales.

Original	English translation
Soldado: asesino de la patria Hombre, rechaza el uniforme que denigra. Yo sé de miles de botas que se hunden en la tierra nuestra, destrozándola.	Soldier: murderer of the fatherland Man, reject the uniform that defames. I know of thousands of boots that sink in our land, destroying it.
Yo sé de la marinería borracha y sádica que como una avalancha de blanco estiércol se riega por calles y plazas vomitando su negro sello de piratas.	I know about the sadistic and drunken seamanship that as an avalanche of white manure spreads through the streets and plazas vomiting its black seal of pirates.
Yo sé de los aviones que ametrallaron nuestros tejados en un día de octubre. Aquel horrible desprecio que llovía en fuego sembrando dolores profundos.	I know of the airplanes that machine-gunned our rooftops in a day of October. That horrible contempt that rained in fire sowing deep pains.
No olvides que la luz no pudo ser ocultada y a su calor la patria suspiró transformándose como un rojo beso en el abrazo azul y desnudo del aire. Sepa usted, Mundo abierto	Do not you forget that the light could not be hidden and from its heat the fatherland sighed transforming like a red kiss in the naked and blue hug of the air. Know this, Open World

== Incarcerated Nationalists ==
FBI list of names of the Nationalists who were incarcerated in 1950 and who were still in prison as of 1954.

Names of the Nationalists who were incarcerated in 1950 and who were still in prison as of 1954.
Aguadilla: Avaro Rivera Walker; Arecibo: Jose Aviles Massanet; Antonio Colon Gonzalez; Antonio Cruz Colon; Carlos Juan Cruz Rivera; Luis Dario Fernandez; Angel Roman Diaz Diaz; Bernando Diaz Diaz; Ricardo Diaz Diaz Sr.; Ricardo Diaz Diaz Jr.; Ismael Diaz Matos; Tomas Gonzalez Candelario; Juan Antonio Gonzalez Marion; Justo Guzman Serrano; Juan Jaca Hernandez; Tomas Lopez De Victoria; Manuel Mendez Gandia; Rafael Molina Centeno; Gilberto Rivera Gonzalez; Jose Serpa Alvarez; Cayey: Eduardo Lopez Vazquez; Ciales: Maximo Carlos Velez Reickeoff; Corozal: Jaime Rafael Crespo Bou; Jayuya: Blanca Canales Torresola; Antonio Colon Gonzalez; Antonio Cruz Colon; Fidel Irizarry Rivera; Mario Irizarry Rivera; Ovidio Irizarry Rivera; Carmelo Maldonado Rivera; Edmidio Marin Pagan; Heriberto Marin Torres; Miguel Angel Marin Davila; Juan Morels Negron; Luis Morales Negron; Reinaldo Morales Negron; Roman Otero Lozada; Alfredo Pabon Rivera; Lisandro Efrain Rivera Torres; Fernando Luis Rivera Santiago; Luis Rivera Fernandez; Ramon Robles Torres; Jose Rodriguez Olivieras; Juan Roman De Jesus; Miguel Angel De Jesus; Carlos Sanchez Rivera; Ramon Sanchez Rivera; Elidio Torres Roman; Doris Torresola Roura	Juncos: Jesus Pomales Gonzalez; Maricao: Juan Ramon Martinez; Mayaguez: Jose Cruzado Ortiz; Carlos Feliciano Vazquez; Ezequel Lugo Morales; Juan Ramon Martinez Quintana; Jose Ramon Muniz Rosado; Amado Eulogio Pena Ramirez; Juan Rodriguez Cruz; Eladio Sotomayor Cancel; Ponce: Jose Miguel Alicea Santiago; Marcelino Berrios Colon; Raul De Jesus Torres; Monserate Del Valle De Lopez de Victoria; William Gutierrez Cadiz; Roberto Jaume Rodriguez; Meliton Muniz Santos; Osvaldo Martinez; Marcelino Turell Rivera; Naranjito: Jose Antonio Negron Rodriguez; Antonio Nieve Aviles; Feliciano Rioveras; San Juan: Pedro Albizu Campos; Olga Isabel Viscal Garriga; Juan Pietri Perez; Rufino Rolon Marrero; Oliverio Pierluissi Soto; Joae Rivera Sotomayor; Pablo Rosado Ortiz; Antonio Moya Velez; Enrique Muniz Medina; Willism Rios Figueroa; Vidal Santiago Diaz; Utuado: Jose Aviles Maisonet; Angel Luis Colon Feliciano; Gilberto Martinez Negron; Jose Angel Medina Gigueroa; Juanita Ojeda Maldonado; Elidio Olivera Albarran; Octavio Ramos Rosario; Vega Alta: Rufino Rolon Marrero

== See also ==
- List of Puerto Ricans
- List of revolutions and rebellions
- Puerto Rican Independence Movement
- Puerto Rican Nationalist Party
