= Attempted assassination of Harry S. Truman =

1950 assassination attempt in the US

Coordinates: 38°53′56″N 77°02′19″W

- Part of Puerto Rican Nationalist Party insurgency
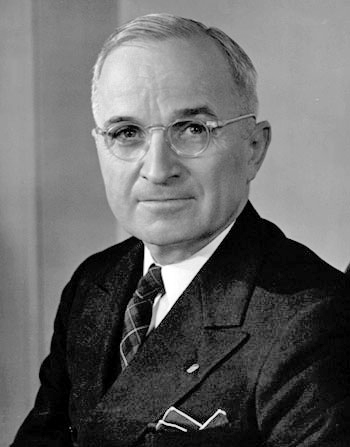
- Harry S. Truman
- Location: Blair House, Washington, D.C., United States
- Date: November 1, 1950; 76 years ago
- Target: Harry S. Truman
- Attack type: Attempted assassination, murder, shooting
- Weapons: Walther P38, Luger pistol
- Deaths: 2 (including one of the perpetrators)
- Injuries: 3 (including one of the perpetrators)
- Perpetrators: Oscar Collazo; Griselio Torresola
- Motive: Discontent over the political status of Puerto Rico
- Verdict: Collazo: Guilty on all counts
- Convictions: Collazo: First degree murder, assault with intent to kill (2 counts)
- Sentence: Collazo: Death; commuted to life imprisonment by Truman (released after 29 years)

On November 1, 1950, Puerto Rican secessionists Oscar Collazo and Griselio Torresola attempted to assassinate President Harry S. Truman at Blair House during the renovation of the White House. Both men were stopped before gaining entry to the house. Torresola mortally wounded White House Police officer Leslie Coffelt, who killed him in return fire. Secret Service agents wounded Collazo. Truman was upstairs in the house and not harmed.

Two days before the assassination attempt, Puerto Rican nationalists had attempted to overthrow the government of Puerto Rico. Uprisings occurred in many towns, including Jayuya, where one of the would-be assassins was born, and in neighbouring Utuado. During the uprising, the U.S. Air Force bombed and strafed both towns, badly damaging them. In acknowledgement of the issues related to Puerto Rico's status, Truman supported a 1952 plebiscite in Puerto Rico. 81.9% of votes were in favor of Puerto Rico continuing as a Free Associated State of the US. Collazo was convicted in federal court and sentenced to death, which Truman commuted to life in prison. In 1979, President Jimmy Carter commuted the sentence to the time served and Collazo was released.

== Background ==
=== Puerto Rican independence movement ===
In the 1940s, the Nationalist Party of Puerto Rico had little political power in the country, where voters had elected the Popular Democratic Party (PPD) as the majority in the legislature. Nationalists believed that Puerto Rico suffered under American colonialism and wanted independence. The PPD supported negotiations with the United States to create a "new" political status for the island.

The Puerto Rican Nationalist Party insurgency was a series of armed protests for independence from United States government rule over Puerto Rico. The Party repudiated the "Free Associated State" (Estado Libre Asociado) status that had been enacted in 1950, as the Nationalists considered it to be a continuation of colonialism.

The revolts began on October 30, 1950, upon the orders of Pedro Albizu Campos, president of the Nationalist Party. Uprisings occurred in Peñuelas, Mayagüez, Naranjito, Arecibo and Ponce. The most notable uprisings occurred in Utuado, Jayuya, and San Juan. These were suppressed by the Puerto Rico National Guard with strong military force, including the use of planes, 500-pound bombs, and 50-calibre machine guns. The town of Jayuya was badly damaged as a result.

== Plans for the assassination ==
In New York City, nationalists Griselio Torresola and Oscar Collazo, after learning of the failure of the October 30 uprising, developed a plan to assassinate Harry S. Truman in order to raise world attention to the Puerto Rican independence movement and the government's suppression of the uprisings. They had learned that Truman was living at Blair House, while the White House was being renovated.

The two men realized that their attempt was near-suicidal and that they likely would be killed. Torresola, a skilled gunman, taught Collazo how to load and handle the guns they would use, as his experience had been with other types. They took the train from New York to Washington, DC to reconnoitre the area. On November 1, they moved into action.

== Attack ==
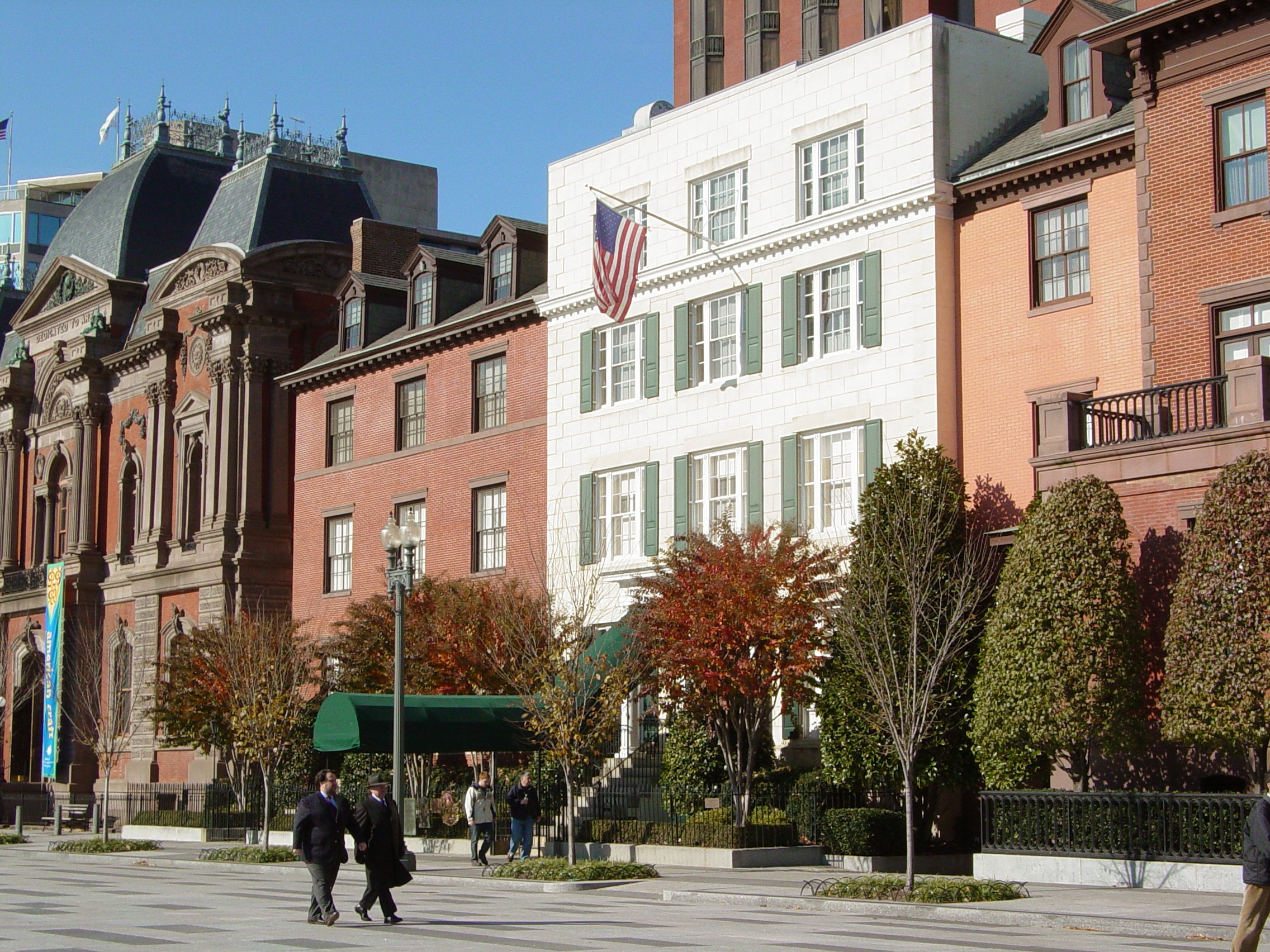
Blair House, site of the attempt, shown here c. 2006. At the time of the attempt, there were two guard booths in front.

Torresola approached Blair House, located on Pennsylvania Avenue, from the west side, while Collazo walked up behind White House police officer, Donald Birdzell, who was standing on the steps of Blair House. Truman was napping in his quarters on the second floor. Collazo tried to shoot Birdzell in the back, but had failed to chamber a round in his pistol, and the gun did not fire. Collazo chambered a round and fired the weapon just as Birdzell was turning to face him, and shot the officer in his right knee.

After hearing the gunshots, Secret Service agent Vincent Mroz ran through a basement corridor, stepping out of a street-level door on the east side of the House, where he opened fire on Collazo. Mroz stopped Collazo with a bullet to the chest while he was on the entrance steps. Two other officers also shot Collazo, in what was described as "the biggest gunfight in Secret Service history."

Meanwhile, Torresola had approached a guard booth at the west corner, where he took White House Police officer Leslie Coffelt by surprise, shooting four times at close range and mortally wounding him with a 9×19mm German Luger. Three of those shots struck Coffelt in the chest and abdomen; the fourth went through his tunic.

Torresola shot police officer Joseph Downs in the hip, before he could draw his weapon. As Downs turned toward the house, Torresola shot him in the back and in the neck. Downs got into the basement and secured the door, denying the attacker entry into Blair House. Torresola moved to the shoot-out between his partner Collazo and several other police officers, shooting officer Donald Birdzell in the left knee.

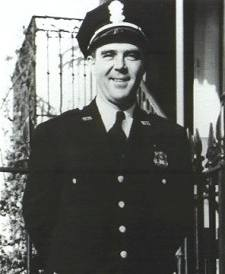
White House Policeman Leslie W. Coffelt

Birdzell could no longer stand and was effectively incapacitated, although he would later recover. Torresola was standing to the left of the Blair House steps to reload when Truman looked outside his second floor window, 31 feet (9.4 m) from the attacker. Secret Service agents shouted at Truman to get away from the window.

At that same moment, Coffelt left the guard booth, propped against it, and fired his .38-caliber service revolver at Torresola, about 30 feet (10 m) away. Coffelt hit Torresola 2 inches (50 mm) above the ear, killing him instantly. Coffelt limped back to the booth and blacked out. Taken to the hospital, Coffelt died four hours later. The gunfight involving Torresola lasted approximately 20 seconds, while the gunfight with Collazo lasted approximately 38.5 seconds. Only one of Collazo's shots hit anyone, largely because Collazo was not a skilled or experienced gunman. Torresola, an expert shooter, did most of the shooting and inflicted almost all of the injuries on the Secret Service officers.

Afterwards, Truman commented that he was not frightened by the attack: since he was a combat veteran of the First World War, he "had [already] been shot at by professionals [i.e. German soldiers]."

== Aftermath ==
Truman and Secretary of State Dean Acheson asked Coffelt's widow, Cressie E. Coffelt, to go to Puerto Rico, where she received condolences from various Puerto Rican leaders and crowds. Cressie Coffelt responded with a speech absolving the island's people of blame for the acts of Collazo and Torresola.

Oscar Collazo was convicted in federal court and sentenced to death, which Truman commuted to a life sentence. While in prison, he gave an interview telling of his long devotion to the Nationalist Party and cause of Puerto Rican independence. When he was a young man in 1932, he heard Pedro Albizu Campos give a speech about American imperialism, saying that American research doctor Cornelius P. Rhoads had written an outrageous letter appearing to brag about killing Puerto Ricans in experiments. In 1979, Jimmy Carter commuted the sentence of Collazo to the time served, and the former revolutionary was released. He returned to live in Puerto Rico, where he continued activities for Puerto Rican independence and died in 1994.

At the time of the assassination attempt, the FBI arrested Collazo's wife, Rosa, on suspicion of having conspired with her husband in the plan. She spent eight months in federal prison but did not go to trial. Upon her release, Rosa continued to work with the Nationalist Party. She helped gather 100,000 signatures in an effort to save her husband from execution.

Acknowledging the importance of the question of Puerto Rico's status, Truman supported a plebiscite in Puerto Rico in 1952 on the new constitution to determine its relationship to the U.S. The people voted 81.9% in favor of continuing as a Free Associated State, as established in 1950.

== In memory ==
Inside Blair House, a plaque was installed to commemorate White House Police officer Leslie Coffelt. The day room for the U.S. Secret Service's Uniformed Division at the Blair House is named for Coffelt as well.

== See also ==
- United States Capitol shooting incident (1954)
- Cerro Maravilla incident
- List of United States presidential assassination attempts
- List of incidents of political violence in Washington, D.C.
- Río Piedras massacre
- Grito de Lares
- Puerto Rican Independence Party
