= Leslie Coffelt =

American police officer (1910–1950)

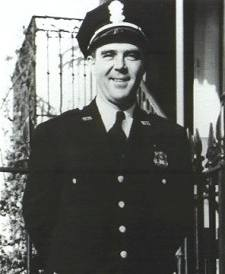
- Born: Leslie William Coffelt; August 15, 1910; Oranda, Virginia, U.S.
- Died: November 1, 1950 (aged 40); Washington, D.C., U.S.
- Cause of death: Gunshot wound
- Resting place: Arlington National Cemetery, Washington, D.C., U.S. 38.880°N 77.070°W
- Spouse: Cressie Morgan (m. 1937)
- Relatives: Cora Jane Wilson (stepdaughter)
- Police career
- Country: United States
- Department: D.C. Metropolitan Police Department; White House Police Force
- Service years: 1929–1936, 1941–1950
- Rank: Officer
- Military service
- Allegiance: United States
- Branch: United States Army
- Service years: 1943–1945
- Units: B Company, 300th Infantry Regiment

Leslie William Coffelt (August 15, 1910 – November 1, 1950) was an officer of the White House Police, a branch of the Secret Service, who was killed while successfully defending U.S. President Harry S. Truman against an attempted assassination on November 1, 1950, at Blair House, where the president was living during renovations at the White House.

Coffelt was wounded during the assassination attempt, which two Puerto Rican nationalists carried out. Though mortally wounded by three bullets, Coffelt returned fire moments later and killed one of the attackers with a single shot to the head. The other was convicted by a federal jury and sentenced to death; Truman commuted the sentence to life imprisonment and Jimmy Carter released the man from jail in 1979.

Acknowledging the importance of the question of Puerto Rico's status, Truman authorized a referendum in Puerto Rico in 1952 to determine its relationship to the U.S.

== Early and personal life ==
Leslie Coffelt was born to Will Coffelt and Effie Keller in the Shenandoah Valley town of Oranda, Virginia. He had four siblings: Harry, Hollis, Norman, and Mildred. He grew up hunting and handling firearms. Coffelt was the second in his family to graduate from high school, and he was described by those who knew him as an expert sharpshooter.

Coffelt met Cressie Elinor Morgan of Uniontown, Pennsylvania, who was training to become a nurse. Coffelt and Morgan were married on October 5, 1937, in Prince George's County, Maryland. They moved into an apartment in Washington. Coffelt was also a Freemason and a member of Potomac Lodge #5 F.A.A.M. in Georgetown, Washington D.C.

== Career ==
In 1928, Coffelt left Oranda to look for a job in Washington, D.C., and became a police officer with the Metropolitan Police Department in 1929. He was assigned to Precinct 3, which ran the length of K Street. In 1936, he resigned to become a building technician.

In 1941, Coffelt returned to the Metropolitan Police. In 1942 he requested and was awarded a transfer to the White House Police.

That year, as the U.S. entered World War II, Coffelt was drafted and assigned to B Company, 300th Infantry Regiment, United States Army. Coffelt served less than two years and never made it overseas; the Army gave him a medical discharge. In 1945, he returned to duty with the White House Police.

Coffelt is buried at Arlington National Cemetery with his wife Cressie (1912–1985).

== Truman assassination attempt ==
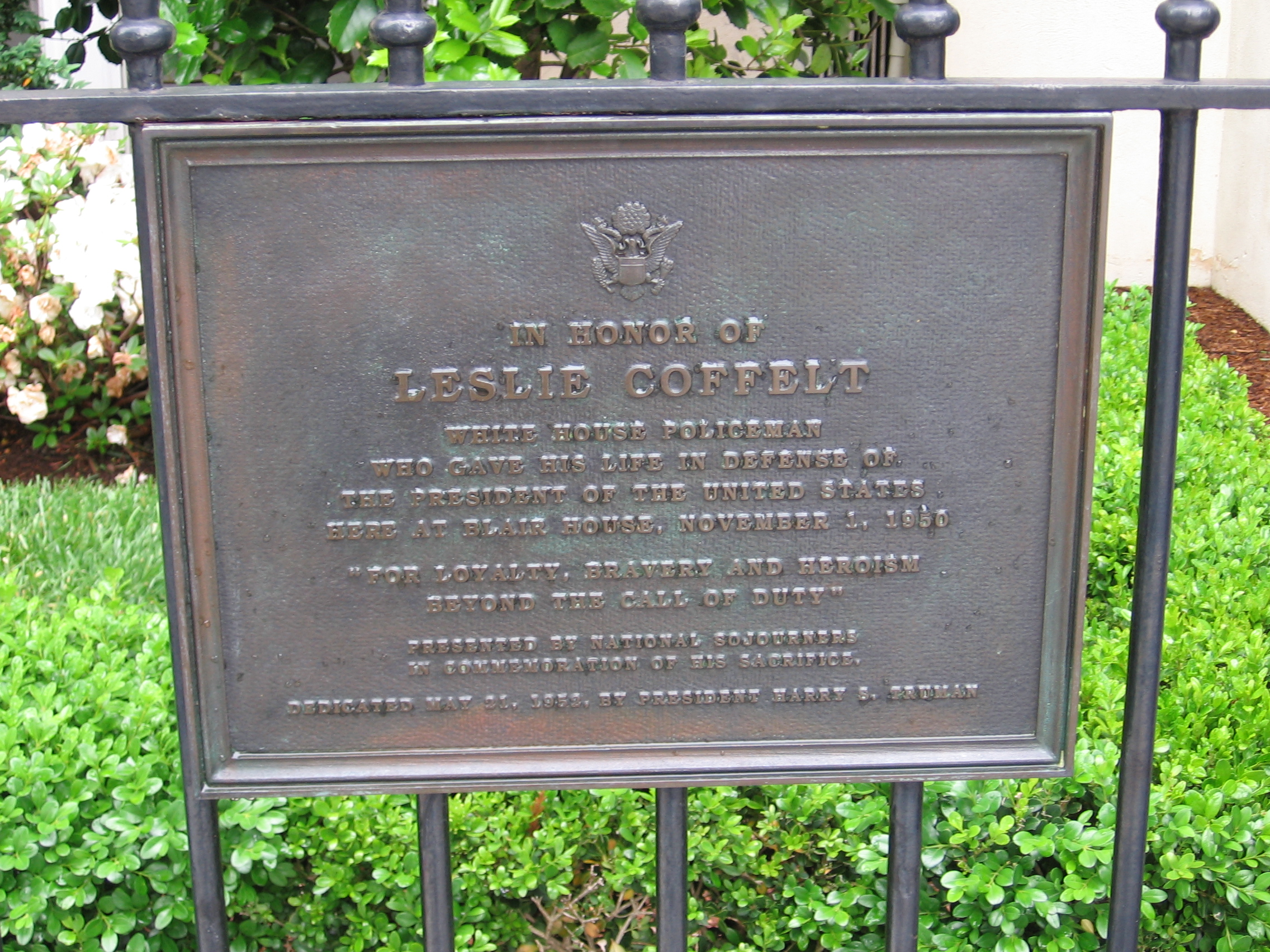
A plaque on the Blair House fence commemorating Coffelt's sacrifice

On November 1, 1950, would-be assassins Griselio Torresola and Oscar Collazo, nationalists who supported the independence of Puerto Rico from the United States, attacked officers at the Blair House in order to assassinate President Truman. He was living there because of a major renovation at the White House for structural problems.

Torresola approached from the west side while Collazo engaged Secret Service agents and White House policemen from the east. Torresola approached the guard booth at the west corner of the Blair House and fired at Coffelt from close range. His three shots struck Coffelt in the chest and abdomen, mortally wounding him. A fourth shot passed through the policeman's tunic.

Torresola shot two other policemen before running out of ammunition, then moved to the left of the Blair House steps to reload. Coffelt went out of his booth and fired at Torresola from 31 feet (9.4 m) away, hitting him behind the ear and killing him instantly. Coffelt limped back to the booth and blacked out. He died of his wounds four hours later in a hospital. He was survived by his wife, Cressie Elinor Coffelt (née Morgan), and stepdaughter, Cora Jane Wilson.

A civilian named Elroy Sites was near Coffelt and helped put him into an ambulance stretcher after the shooting.

External audio
- Newsreel scenes in English of the assassination attempt on U.S. President Harry S Truman on YouTube

== Aftermath ==
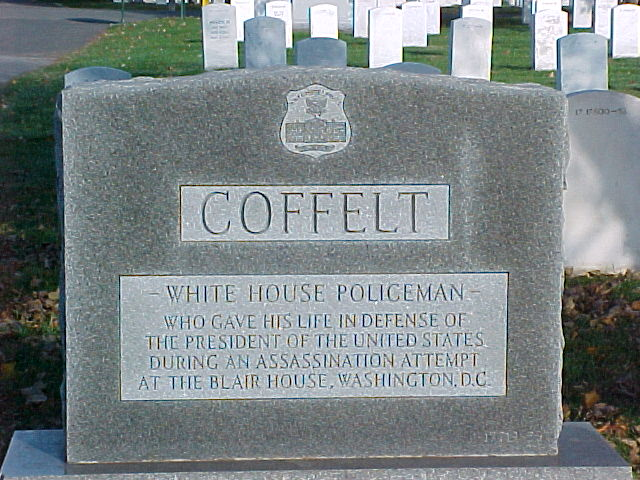
Coffelt's tombstone at Arlington National Cemetery

President Truman wrote in a letter a short time later:

I'm sorry I didn't get to talk to you and (cousin) Nellie at the dinner or after it. But I'm really a prisoner now.

...The grand guards who were hurt in the attempt on me didn't have a fair chance. The one who was killed was just cold bloodedly murdered before he could do anything. But his assassin did not live but a couple of minutes – one of the S.S. (Secret Service) men put a bullet in one ear and it came out the other...

The S.S. chief said to me, "Mr. President, don't you know that when there's an Air Raid Alarm you don't run out and look up, you go for cover." I saw the point but it was over then.

Hope it won't happen again. They won't let me go walking or even cross the street on foot. I say 'they' won't, but it causes them so much anguish that I conform ... But I want no more guards killed. – Letter from Truman to his cousin, Ethel Noland, dated November 17, 1950

Coffelt's widow, Cressie E. Coffelt, was later asked by the President and the Secretary of State to go to Puerto Rico, to accept the condolences and expressions of sorrow for her husband's death from various Puerto Rican leaders and crowds. Mrs. Coffelt made a speech acknowledging that the island's people were not responsible for the acts of Collazo and Torresola.

Oscar Collazo was convicted and sentenced to death in federal court; Truman commuted the sentence to life imprisonment. Acknowledging the importance of the question of Puerto Rican independence, Truman allowed a plebiscite in Puerto Rico in 1952 to determine the status of its relationship to the U.S. The people voted to continue as a Free Associated State, as established in 1950.

Coffelt was buried in Arlington National Cemetery on November 4, 1950, in Section 17, Site 17719–59. His epitaph reads, "White House Policeman: Who Gave His Life in Defense of the President of the United States During an Assassination Attempt at the Blair House, Washington, D.C." To this day, Coffelt is one of only four Secret Service members to take a bullet while defending the President, the others being Donald Birdzell and Joseph Downs, who were wounded during the same incident, and Tim McCarthy, who was wounded in the abdomen by John Hinckley Jr. during the attempted assassination of Ronald Reagan.

In 1979, President Jimmy Carter commuted Collazo's sentence to time served and granted him release from prison. Collazo returned to Puerto Rico, where he died in 1994.

A plaque at the Blair House commemorates Coffelt's sacrifice. The day room for the U.S. Secret Service's Uniformed Division at the Blair House is named for Coffelt. The Secret Service Office of Training's Leslie Coffelt Marksmanship Award is awarded to graduating recruits with the highest average score for all courses of fire using the agency's standard-issue pistols, shotguns, submachine guns, and rifles.
