= Griselio Torresola =

Puerto Rican militant (1925–1950)

- Born: July 19, 1925; Jayuya, Puerto Rico
- Died: November 1, 1950 (aged 25); Washington, D.C., U.S.
- Cause of death: Gunshot wound
- Known for: Attempted assassination of Harry S. Truman
- Political party: Puerto Rican Nationalist Party
- Movement: Puerto Rican Independence

Griselio Torresola Roura (July 19, 1925 – November 1, 1950) was a Puerto Rican militant of the Nationalist Party. He and Oscar Collazo attempted to assassinate United States President Harry Truman on November 1, 1950. Torresola mortally wounded White House policeman Private Leslie Coffelt and wounded two other law enforcement officers. Torresola was killed by a return shot from Coffelt.

== Early life and political background ==
Torresola was born in Jayuya, Puerto Rico. His family believed in the Puerto Rican independence cause. They had participated in many of the island's past revolts. At the age of 23 Torresola moved to New York City in August 1948 to gain work. He was employed by a New York stationery and perfume store. Affected by a separation from his first wife, he lost his job. A member of the Puerto Rican Nationalist Party, Torresola joined the New York City chapter of the party, where he met fellow Nationalist Oscar Collazo.

He lived with his new love Carmen Dolores Otero, who was pregnant with their second child, and their young daughter Rebecca, on a welfare check of $125 a month.

== Jayuya Uprising ==
Nationalists had been angered by what they viewed as great injustices during previous decades, including the Ponce massacre (1937), the extrajudicial murders of some members, and the jailing of Pedro Albizu Campos, president of the Nationalist Party, for his advocacy of violent resistance. They felt the impending changes of Puerto Rico's status from a non-autonomous territory to a partially self-governing commonwealth were a continuation of United States imperialism. They viewed Puerto Rico as a colony demanding independence from the United States.

On October 30, 1950, Torresola's brother and sister participated in the Jayuya Uprising, part of insurgent efforts across Puerto Rico by Nationalists. They attacked police headquarters and other facilities. The island government declared martial law and attacked the town with U.S. P-47 Thunderbolt fighter planes, land-based artillery, mortar fire, grenades, and the Puerto Rican National Guard. The planes machine-gunned nearly every rooftop in the town. The Nationalists held the town for two days; after they were overcome, the government made mass arrests. In New York City, Torresola was angered by the situation. He later learned that an extensive part of his hometown was destroyed, but the scale of military response was not reported outside of Puerto Rico. The American media reported President Truman as saying it was an "incident between Puerto Ricans." Torresola learned that his sister was wounded and his brother arrested in the uprising.

== Assassination attempt ==
External audio
- Newsreel scenes in English of the assassination attempt on U.S. President Harry S Truman on YouTube

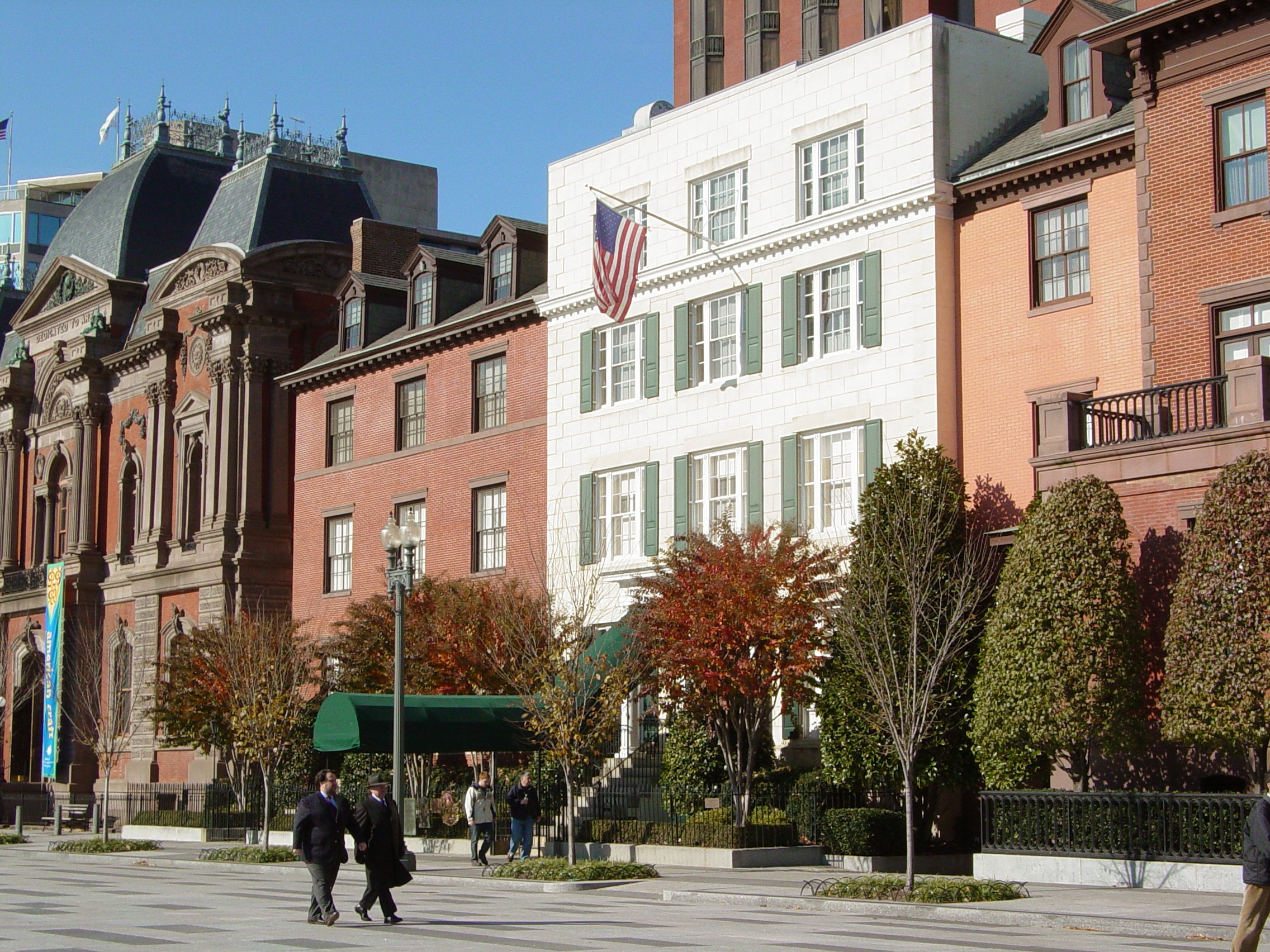
Blair House, site of the attempt, as it is today. At the time of the attempt there were two guard booths out front.

Together Torresola and Collazo decided they needed to act quickly to bring the cause of independence to world attention. Having learned that President Truman was living at Blair House while the White House was being renovated, they thought security would be less. They decided to assassinate him to gain publicity for their cause.

The two men took the train from New York south to Washington, DC. On November 1, 1950, they approached Blair House. Torresola walked up Pennsylvania Avenue from the west side while his partner, Oscar Collazo, engaged Secret Service special agents and White House policemen from the east. Torresola approached a guard booth at the west corner of the Blair house, and noted an officer, sitting inside. Torresola quickly fired four shots from his 9 mm German Luger, semi-automatic pistol at close range at the officer, who was Leslie Coffelt, before he could react. Three of the shots struck Coffelt in the chest and abdomen, and the fourth went through his policeman's tunic. Coffelt slumped down in his chair, mortally wounded.

Torresola saw that a plainclothes White House policeman named Joseph Downs had turned back toward him. Torresola shot him in the hip before he could draw his weapon, and twice more. Wounded, Downs escaped through the basement door and locked it to prevent Torresola from entering. Torresola then turned his attention to a firefight between Collazo and several law enforcement officers. Torresola shot District of Columbia policeman Donald Birdzell in the left knee from a distance of approximately 40 feet, incapacitating him and preventing him from shooting Collazo.

Standing to the left of the Blair House steps as he reloaded, Torresola was only 30 feet from President Truman, who had been awakened by the gunfire and looked outside. Agents yelled at him to get away from the window. The dying officer Coffelt struggled outside the guard booth and shot Torresola in the head. Coffelt's bullet went through Torresola's head and blew out a portion of his brain, killing him instantly.

Coffelt died of his three bullet wounds several hours later. The overall gunfight lasted less than 40 seconds. Torresola was survived by his wife and two children. He was buried at the Jayuya Municipal Cemetery in Jayuya, Puerto Rico.

== Aftermath ==
Oscar Collazo survived his wounds despite being shot multiple times by the officers, was convicted at trial of murder, and sentenced to death. President Truman commuted his sentence to life. After serving 27 years in Leavenworth Federal Prison in Kansas, Collazo had his sentence commuted to time served by President Jimmy Carter. Collazo was released in 1979 and soon returned to Puerto Rico where he continued to support the independence movement. He died in 1994 at age 80. Collazo is quoted as saying, "It would not be justice to Griselio if we merely remembered him for his ability with weapons. We must remember the brave and expert guerrilla of the mountains of Jayuya as the patriot who never had doubts when his country called him to completion of his duty."

== See also ==
- Puerto Rican Nationalist Party Revolts of the 1950s
- List of Puerto Ricans
