= Oscar Collazo =

Puerto Rican militant (1914–1994)

Oscar Collazo López
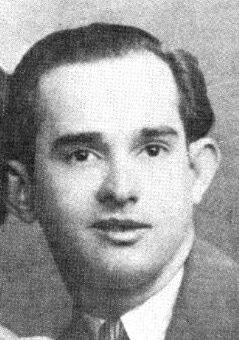
- Born: January 20, 1914; Florida, Puerto Rico
- Died: February 21, 1994 (aged 80); Vega Baja, Puerto Rico
- Known for: Attempted assassination of Harry S. Truman
- Political party: Puerto Rican Nationalist Party
- Movement: Puerto Rican Independence
- Spouse: Rosa Cortez de Collazo
- Motive: Puerto Rican nationalism
- Convictions: First degree murder Assault with intent to kill (2 counts)
- Penalty: Death; commuted to life imprisonment; further commuted to time served

Details
- Victims: Leslie Coffelt, 40 (as an accomplice)
- Date: November 1, 1950
- Country: United States
- Location: Washington, D.C.
- Target: Harry S. Truman
- Injured: Donald Birdzell

Oscar Collazo (January 20, 1914 – February 21, 1994) was a Puerto Rican militant of the Nationalist Party. He and Griselio Torresola were responsible for the attempted assassination of U.S. President Harry S. Truman in Washington, D.C. on November 1, 1950. He had been living in New York City after growing up in Puerto Rico.

Collazo was convicted and sentenced to death, but Truman commuted his sentence to life imprisonment. In 1979, Collazo's sentence was further commuted to time served by President Jimmy Carter. He was paroled and allowed to return to Puerto Rico.

== Background ==
Oscar Collazo López (Note: In this Spanish name, the first or paternal surname is Collazo and the second or maternal family name is López.) was born in what is now Florida, Puerto Rico. In 1920, Collazo's father died and his mother sent him to live with his brother in Jayuya. His brother was a member of the Liberal Party which had independence beliefs. When Collazo was 14 years old, he participated in a student demonstration, which the government had made illegal, commemorating the birth of José de Diego, a known advocate for Puerto Rican independence who had died two years before.

== Career ==
=== Puerto Rico ===
In 1932, when Collazo was 18 years old, he participated in another demonstration commemorating José de Diego. This time the main speaker was Pedro Albizu Campos, the president of the Puerto Rican Nationalist Party. That day Collazo was so impressed by Albizu Campos' leadership that he joined the Nationalist Party and devoted himself to it.

Collazo heard Albizu talk about the abuses of American imperialism, as symbolized by Cornelius P. Rhoads, an American doctor who had written a controversial letter claiming to have killed Puerto Ricans in experiments. Outraged, Albizu had complained to the governor and gained an investigation. Rhoads was eventually cleared of any crime.

=== New York ===
In 1941, Collazo moved to New York City, which had a large Puerto Rican community. There he met and married Rosa Cortez, a divorcee. The couple had a total of three daughters from previous marriages: Rosa with two and Collazo with one. He worked in a metal polishing factory and led a normal family life.

He met and became friends with Albizu Campos when the latter was hospitalized for a time at the Columbus Hospital. Collazo had become the secretary and later served as president of the New York branch of the Nationalist Party. After he met Griselio Torresola in New York, the two men soon became friends.

=== Truman assassination attempt ===
On October 30, 1950, Torresola and Collazo learned that the Jayuya Uprising in Puerto Rico, led by the nationalist leader Blanca Canales, had failed. Torresola's sister had been wounded and his brother Elio was arrested. Believing they had to do something for their cause, Collazo and Torresola decided to assassinate President Harry S. Truman, in order to bring world attention to the need for independence in Puerto Rico.

External audio
- Newsreel scenes in English of the assassination attempt on U.S. President Harry S Truman on YouTube

On October 31, 1950, Collazo and Torresola arrived at Union Station in Washington, D.C., and registered in the Harris Hotel. On November 1, 1950, with guns in hand, they attempted to enter the Blair House, where the President was living during renovation of the White House. During the attack, Torresola mortally wounded White House Police officer, Private Leslie Coffelt. Collazo wounded another man. After wounding two others, Torresola was killed by the mortally wounded Coffelt. Collazo was shot in the chest and arrested.

In prison, Collazo was asked why he had targeted Truman, who was in favor of self-determination for Puerto Rico and who had appointed the first native-born Puerto Rican governor. Collazo replied that he had nothing against Truman, saying that he was "a symbol of the system. You don't attack the man, you attack the system." Collazo said he had been devoted to the Nationalist Party since 1932.

Truman supported organizing a referendum in 1952 by which residents in Puerto Rico could vote on a proposed new constitution, which defined the island's status as an Estado Libre Associado, or Commonwealth. It was approved by 81.9% of voters.

Collazo's trial was set for February 26, 1951. In 1952, Collazo was convicted and sentenced to death. In 1952, his attorney Abraham Unger petitioned for the commutation of Collazo’s life sentence for his attempted assassination of Truman. President Truman commuted his sentence to life imprisonment. He was sent to the federal prison at Leavenworth, Kansas.

=== Second presidential commutation ===
On September 6, 1979, President Jimmy Carter commuted his sentence to time served, after Collazo had spent 29 years in prison. President Carter also pardoned Collazo's fellow Nationalists: Irvin Flores, Rafael Cancel Miranda, and Lolita Lebrón, convicted in the 1954 United States Capitol shooting in which five members of the House of Representatives were wounded by gunfire. Collazo had been eligible for parole since April 1966, and Lebron since July 1969. Cancel Miranda and Flores became eligible for parole in July 1979, but none had applied for parole because of their political beliefs. Attorney General Benjamin Civiletti advocated to Carter for the commutations because the prisoners had spent "an unusually long time in prison" and "no legitimate deterrent or correctional purpose" was served by keeping them imprisoned, for "humane considerations," and because there was "little substantial risk" of their release resulting in further criminal or terrorist activity. Upon their return to Puerto Rico, these Nationalists were received as heroes by their supporters and independence groups. Governor of Puerto Rico Carlos Romero Barceló publicly opposed the pardons, stating that they would encourage terrorism and undermine public safety.

Collazo's wife, Rosa, had been arrested at the time of the assassination attempt by the Federal Bureau of Investigation (FBI) on suspicion of having conspired with her husband. She spent eight months in federal prison. Upon her release from prison, Rosa Collazo continued to work with the Nationalist Party. She helped gather 100,000 signatures in an effort to save her husband from the electric chair.

=== Later years ===
In 1979, Collazo and the other nationalists were decorated by Cuba's President Fidel Castro. In the Puerto Rican Cultural Center of Chicago, Illinois, is a mural honoring Puerto Rico's independence leaders; it includes images of Collazo and Torresola.

Oscar and Rosa Collazo eventually were divorced. She continued to actively participate in Puerto Rico's independence movement. In 1984 a commemoration for her independence activities was held in the Bar Association Building. She was also given recognition for her efforts towards the commutation of her ex-husband's death sentence. Rosa Collazo, who died in May 1988, lived the last years of her life by the side of her daughter Lydia Collazo Cortez.

Oscar Collazo continued to participate in activities related to the independence movement. On February 21, 1994, he died of a stroke in Vega Baja, having passed his 80th birthday by just over a month.

== See also ==
- Oscar López Rivera
- Puerto Rican Nationalist Party Revolts of the 1950s
- List of Puerto Ricans
- List of people pardoned or granted clemency by the president of the United States
