= Human rights museum =

Museum related to human rights incidents

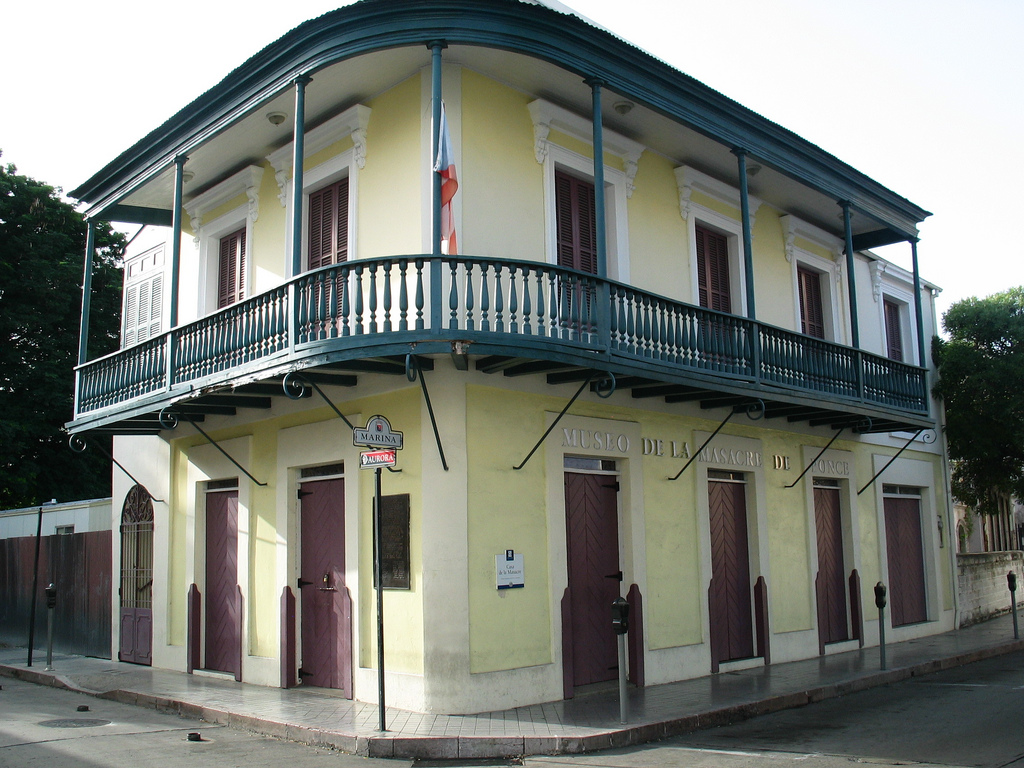
The Ponce massacre building and street corner. Today the building is the Ponce Massacre Museum honoring the victims of the 1937 Ponce massacre

A human rights museum is a museum that specializes in the display of artifacts and memorabilia related to human rights incidents. Some, such as the Canadian Museum for Human Rights operate to "enhance the public's understanding of human rights, promote respect for others, and encourage reflection and dialogue". Others commemorate specific events, like Museum of Memory and Human Rights, in Chile, which "commemorates the victims of human rights violations during the civic-military regime led by former leader Augusto Pinochet between 1973 and 1990."

Still others, such as Museo de la Masacre de Ponce, in Ponce, Puerto Rico, perform both functions, displaying artifacts and memorabilia related to specific events as well as seeking to enhance the public's understanding of human rights, promote respect for others, and encourage reflection and understanding. Some human rights museums, such as the Human Rights Museum Osaka, are multi-themed, dedicated, for example, to the struggle of minority groups as well as to the survivors of the atomic bombing of Hiroshima and Nagasaki.

== See also ==
- National Center for Civil and Human Rights
- Universal Declaration of Human Rights
- International Council of Museums
- International Museum Day (18 May)
- List of museums
- .museum
- Museum education
- Museum fatigue
- Museum label
- Types of museums
