= Tomás López de Victoria =

Commander of the Cadets of the Republic of the Puerto Rican Nationalist Party

- Born: 1911 (age 114–115); Juana Díaz, Puerto Rico
- Political party: Puerto Rican Nationalist Party
- Movement: Puerto Rican independence

Notes
- López de Victoria was the Sub-Commander of the Cadets of the Republic.

Tomás López de Victoria (1911–????) was a political activist and the Sub-Commander of the Cadets of the Republic. These cadets were the official youth organization within the Puerto Rican Nationalist Party. They were also known as the Ejército Libertador de Puerto Rico (The Liberation Army of Puerto Rico).

On March 21, 1937, López de Victoria, as Captain of the Ponce branch of cadets, led his group in a peaceful march in the city of Ponce. The march turned into a bloody police slaughter known as the Ponce massacre, when the police fired their weapons against the Nationalists and innocent bystanders, killing 18 Puerto Ricans and wounding over 200 others.

On October 30, 1950, a series of revolts occurred in scattered locations in Puerto Rico in opposition to U.S. colonial rule. These were known as the Puerto Rican Nationalist Party revolts. On that day of October 30, López de Victoria led the Nationalist revolt in the town of Arecibo.

== Early years ==
López de Victoria (birth name: Tomás López de Victoria Laboy) was born in the town of Juana Díaz, Puerto Rico. Shortly after his birth, his mother Rita Laboy and sister Pura moved to his grandmother's house in the barrio Quarto of the City of Ponce. There he received his primary and secondary education.

== Cadets of the Republic ==
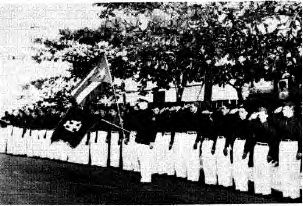
Cadets of the Republic in formation

The Puerto Rican Nationalist Party, founded on September 17, 1922, is a political party whose main objective is to work for Puerto Rican independence. López de Victoria's sister Pura, was a member of the Ponce Municipal Board of officers of the party.

López de Victoria's political ideals were influenced by his sister and by the local Nationalist leader José Enamorado Cuesta, who introduced him to the teachings of Don Pedro Albizu Campos, the party president. In 1932, López de Victoria swore allegiance to the Nationalist Party before Eufemio Rodríguez Pérez, the president of Ponce's Municipal Board of officers.

López de Victoria was a member of the Freemason Lodge in Ponce founded by the members of the Puerto Rican Free Masons, who were also advocates of Puerto Rican independence. As member of the Nationalist Party, he was recruited into the Ponce branch of the Cadets of the Republic.

The Cadets of the Republic, known in Spanish as Cadetes de la República, was a quasi-military youth organization of the Puerto Rican Nationalist Party. Also known as the "Liberation Army of Puerto Rico" (Ejército Libertador de Puerto Rico), they were organized in the 1930s by Dr. Pedro Albizu Campos.

Puerto Rican Nationalist Party Flag

The Cross potent

Cadet candidates were taught the ideals of the party by the Nationalist Municipal Board President. They were then required to take an oath of allegiance to the PRNP. During the verbal oath ceremony the cadets had to place a hand on the Nationalist flag, which was itself symbolic.

The flag showed a white Calatrava Cross, also known as the Cross potent on the middle of a black background. The Cross of Calatrava was first used by the Crusaders of Calatrava and later by the French revolutionaries. The black background symbolized the mourning of the Puerto Rican nation in colonial captivity.

Cadets swore to be faithful to the Nationalist Party and to participate in public activities organized by the party. Contrary to what some believe, they did not swear to overthrow the Government of the United States. They did, however, vow to fight for Puerto Rico's independence from colonial rule, by whatever means necessary.

As a cadet, López de Victoria received his military training from José Enamorado Cuesta, a cadet drill instructor. López de Victoria practiced military drills and was taught military tactics. He used a wooden rifle during his training.

Commandant Enamorado Cuesta was impressed with the skills of López de Victoria and eventually named him Captain of the cadets in Ponce. López de Victoria completely dedicated himself to the military organizational structure of his group and to the ideals of his party.

== Ponce massacre ==
On April 3, 1936, a Federal Grand Jury submitted accusations against Pedro Albizu Campos, Juan Antonio Corretjer, Luis F. Velázquez, Clemente Soto Vélez, Erasmo Velázquez, Julio H. Velázquez, Rafael Ortiz Pacheco, Juan Gallardo Santiago, and Pablo Rosado Ortiz. They were charged with sedition and other violations of Title 18 of the United States Code. Title 18 of the United States Code is the criminal and penal code of the federal government of the United States. It deals with federal crimes and criminal procedure.

The Nationalist Party and the cadets wanted to celebrate a peaceful parade in Ponce on March 21, 1937, in commemoration of the abolition of slavery and to protest the jailing of its leaders, including Pedro Albizu Campos.

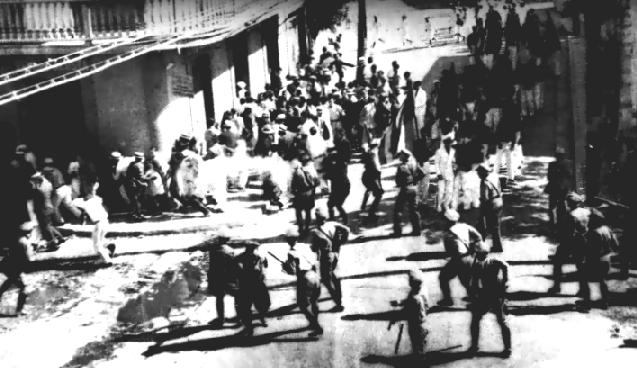
Carlos Torres Morales, a photo journalist for the newspaper El Imparcial was covering the march and took this photograph when the shooting began.

Several days before the scheduled Palm Sunday march, Casimiro Berenguer, the military instructor of the Cadets of the Republic, received permission from Ponce Mayor Tormos Diego to proceed with the parade. However, upon learning of the planned protest, the colonial governor of Puerto Rico at the time, General Blanton Winship (who had been appointed by US president Franklin Delano Roosevelt) demanded the immediate withdrawal of the permits.

Without notice to the organizers, or any opportunity to appeal, or any time to arrange an alternate venue, the permits were abruptly withdrawn, just before the protest was scheduled to begin Colonel Orbeta, Chief of Police under governor Winship, went to Ponce concentrating police units from across the island, among which he included all the machine gunners in the island.

Amongst the participants present for the peaceful activity were Raimundo Díaz Pacheco, the Comandante (Commander) of the Cadets of the Republic, the members of the Ponce branch of the cadets, and the women's branch of the Nationalist Party known as the Hijas de la Libertad (Daughters of Freedom).

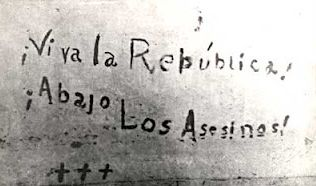
"Viva la Republica, Abajo los Asesinos" message which cadet Bolivar Marquez Telechea wrote with his blood before he died

López de Victoria, was in charge of the cadets in the parade. Moments before the march began, the head of the insular police walked up to López de Victoria and ordered him to keep the cadets from marching.

López de Victoria responded by ordering the cadet band to play the Puerto Rican national anthem La Borinqueña, and to continue with their march. As the Nationalists began marching the police - empowered by the North American police chief and encouraged by the governor - opened fire on the cadets and bystanders alike. Firing with impunity for over 15 minutes from four different positions, they killed men, women and children.

The flag-bearer of the cadets was shot and killed during the massacre. A young girl named Carmen Fernández proceeded to take the flag, but was shot and gravely injured. A young cadet named Bolívar Márquez, despite being mortally wounded, dragged himself to a wall and wrote the following message with his own blood, before succumbing to his wounds:

"¡Viva la República, Abajo los asesinos!"

("Long live the Republic, Down with the Murderers!")

Nineteen people were killed in the Ponce massacre, and about 235 were wounded. The dead included 17 men, one woman, and a seven-year-old girl. Some of the dead were demonstrators, while others were simply passers-by. Many were chased by the police and shot or clubbed at the entrance of their houses as they tried to escape. Others were taken from their hiding places and killed.

External videos
- You may watch newsreel scenes of the Ponce massacre on YouTube

Leopold Tormes, a member of the Puerto Rican legislature, told reporters how a policeman murdered a Nationalist with his bare hands. Dr. José N. Gándara, one of the physicians who assisted the wounded, testified that wounded people running away were shot, and that many were again wounded by the clubs and bare fists of the police. No arms were found in the hands of the wounded civilians, nor on the dead ones. About 150 of the demonstrators were arrested immediately afterward and were later released on bail.

=== Attempt against Governor Winship ===
The year after the Ponce massacre, on July 25, 1938, Governor Winship decided to celebrate the invasion of Puerto Rico by the United States with a military parade. For a venue, he specifically chose the city of Ponce, in order to demonstrate that his "Law and Order" policy had been a successful one against the Nationalists. Since 19 Puerto Ricans had been slaughtered in Ponce just one year earlier, this decision proved to be disastrous.

The parade was greeted with a hail of bullets fired towards the grandstand, in an attempt to assassinate Governor Winship. It was the first time in Puerto Rican history that an attempt was made on a governor's life. Winship escaped unscathed, but 36 other people were wounded.

The dead included Nationalist Angel Esteban Antongiorgi, and National Guard Colonel Luis Irizarry. Despite the Nationalist Party's disavowal of any participation in the attack, several Nationalists were arrested and nine were accused of "murder and conspiracy to incite violence." Among the nine Nationalists accused was Lopez de Victoria and fellow cadets Elifaz Escobar, Santiago Gonzalez Castro, Juan Pietri and Prudencio Segarra.

Winship proceeded to declare war against the Nationalists, to which Jaime Benitez, a student at the University of Chicago at the time, wrote a letter to President Roosevelt, read as follows: "The point I am to make is that the Governor [Winship] himself through his military approach to things has helped keep Puerto Rico in an unnecessary state of turmoil. He seems to think that the political problem of Puerto Rico limits itself to a fight between himself and the Nationalists, that no holds are barred in that fight and that everybody else should keep out. As a matter of fact he has played the Nationalist game and they have played his.

Winship jailed many Nationalists, who served 8 years in the State Penitentiary of Puerto Rico. Since this action was unjust, the next Governor Rexford Guy Tugwell was constrained to pardon these same Nationalists.

=== Nationalist Party revolts of the 1950s ===
By the 1950s, López de Victoria held the rank of "Colonel-Sub-Commander" of the cadets, second only in the organization to Díaz Pacheco. Membership in the cadets began to dwindle as a result of the persecution which the cadets were subject to by local and federal agencies of United States. In the 1950s the official hierarchy of the Cadets of the Republic was the following:

Name of Cadet	Rank and Company
Raimundo Díaz Pacheco	Commander-in-Chief
Tomás López de Victoria	Colonel - Sub-Commander
Juan Jaca Hernández	Captain of Arecibo
José Antonio Vélez Lugo	Captain of Mayagüez
Ramón Pedroza Rivera	Captain of Ponce
Fernando Lebron	Captain of Rio Piedras
Antonio Colón Save	Captain of Santurce
Heriberto Castro Ríos	Captain of Utuado

Various incidents between the government and the party led to call for an armed revolt by the Puerto Rican Nationalist Party against United States Government rule over Puerto Rico.

The revolts specifically repudiated the so-called "Free Associated State" (Estado Libre Asociado) designation of Puerto Rico - a designation widely recognized as a colonial farce.

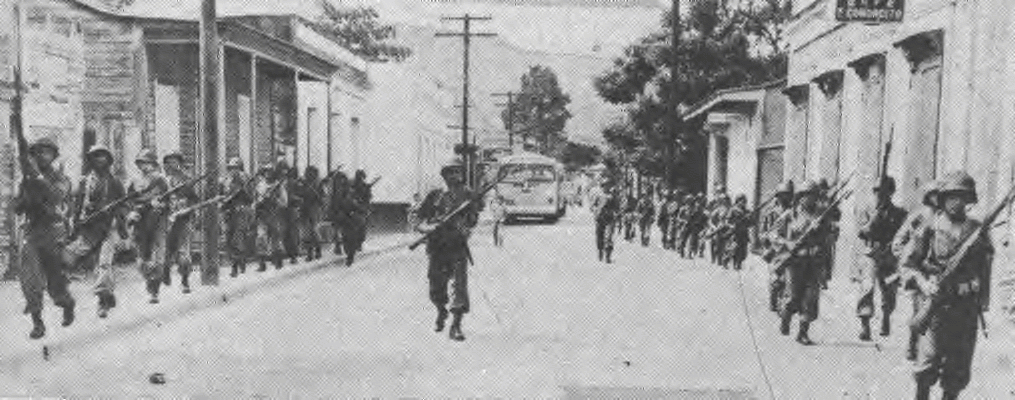
The National Guard occupy Jayuya

The revolts, known as the Puerto Rican Nationalist Party revolts of the 1950s, began on October 30, 1950, upon the orders of Nationalist leader Albizu Campos, with uprisings in various towns, among them Arecibo, Mayagüez, Naranjito, Peñuelas and Ponce. The most notable uprisings occurred in Utuado, Jayuya, and San Juan.

It was estimated by the FBI that 40 per cent of the cadet membership participated in the revolts. They participated in every incident of the revolts, however among the more notable incidents in which the cadets were involved were the following:

López de Victoria led the revolt in the town of Arecibo, which was triviliazed by the FBI as "The Arecibo Incident." He ordered Ismael Díaz Matos, a Nationalist leader, to attack the local police station. Díaz Matos did as commanded and killed four policemen before fleeing. Fellow Nationalist Hipólito Miranda Díaz was killed while covering his comrades' escape.

Díaz Matos and his group were captured and arrested by the National Guard. Among the cadets arrested and charged with organizing the attack, were López de Victoria and Juan Jaca Hernández, cadet Captain of Arecibo.

== Aftermath ==
The revolt of October 1950 failed because of the overwhelming force used by the U.S. military, the U.S. National Guard, the FBI, the CIA, and the Puerto Rican Insular Police - all of whom were aligned against the Nationalists. This force included the machine-gunning of Nationalists and cadets alike, and the aerial bombing of the towns of Jayuya and Utuado.

United States law mandated that U.S. President Harry Truman take direct charge in all matters concerning Puerto Rico. In addition, the Governor of Puerto Rico, Luis Muñoz Marín was required to consult directly with the White House. But this did not occur.

Instead, President Truman distanced himself entirely from the uprisings, and acted as if they had never occurred. In addition, the news of the U.S. military response, which killed dozens of Puerto Ricans and wounded hundreds more, was prevented from spreading outside of Puerto Rico. Instead, it was called an "incident between Puerto Ricans."

Hundreds of cadets and Nationalists, which included López de Victoria, were arrested by mid-November 1950, and the party was never the same. The Cadets of the Republic ceased to function as an officially organized military organ of the Puerto Rican Nationalist Party.

According to the FBI Files - Puerto Rico Nationalist Party; (SJ 100-3; Vol. 23), Aguedo Ramos Mendoza (who once served as Commander of Instruction for the cadets) and Faustino Díaz Pacheco (the brother of Cadet Commander Ramon Díaz Pacheco) both "cooperated" with the FBI, and provided them vital and ongoing intelligence about the cadets, for a period of several years.

Both of these men - Mendoza and Pacheco - provided the FBI with copious and detailed information about the membership, structure, funding, and activities of the Cadets of the Republic. In providing the FBI this information, both men betrayed the Nationalist movement. Pacheco, of course, betrayed his own brother.

== Later years ==
Through the mandates of the Freedom of Information Act, it is currently known that the FBI and CIA filed millions of pages of surveillance reports on the leaders of the Puerto Rican independence movement. However, little is known of what became of Tomás López de Victoria, the Sub-Commander of the Cadets of the Republic - except that, in 1954, he was still incarcerated in a United States Federal penitentiary.

== See also ==
- List of Puerto Ricans
- List of revolutions and rebellions
- Cadets of the Republic

19th Century male leaders of the Puerto Rican Independence Movement

- Ramón Emeterio Betances
- Mathias Brugman
- Francisco Ramírez Medina
- Manuel Rojas
- Segundo Ruiz Belvis
- Antonio Valero de Bernabé

19th Century female leaders of the Puerto Rican Independence Movement

- María de las Mercedes Barbudo
- Lola Rodríguez de Tió
- Mariana Bracetti

Male members of the Puerto Rican Nationalist Party

- Pedro Albizu Campos
- José S. Alegría
- Casimiro Berenguer
- Elías Beauchamp
- Rafael Cancel Miranda
- José Coll y Cuchí
- Oscar Collazo
- Juan Antonio Corretjer
- Carmelo Delgado Delgado
- Raimundo Díaz Pacheco
- Irvin Flores
- Andres Figueroa Cordero
- Hiram Rosado
- Hugo Margenat
- Francisco Matos Paoli
- Vidal Santiago Díaz
- Daniel Santos
- Clemente Soto Vélez
- Griselio Torresola
- Antonio Vélez Alvarado
- Carlos Vélez Rieckehoff
- Teófilo Villavicencio Marxuach

Female members of the Puerto Rican Nationalist Party

- Julia de Burgos
- Blanca Canales
- Rosa Collazo
- Lolita Lebrón
- Isabel Rosado
- Isabel Freire de Matos
- Ruth Mary Reynolds
- Isolina Rondón
- Olga Viscal Garriga

Articles related to the Puerto Rican Independence Movement

- Puerto Rican Nationalist Party
- Ponce massacre
- Río Piedras massacre
- Puerto Rican Independence Party
- Grito de Lares
- Intentona de Yauco
