= Félix Astol Artés =

Spanish musician (1813–1901)

Fèlix Astol i Artés (9 October 1813 – 21 January 1901) was a Spanish musician and composer from Catalonia best known for being the co-composer of "La Borinqueña", the national anthem of Puerto Rico.

== Early life ==
Artés was born in Reus, in Catalonia, region of Spain on 9 October 1813, but he moved to Cuba in 1828 to evade military service. Forced to enlist, he joined the band of one of the battalions based in Havana.

== Career ==
Once he graduated, he found employment doing tenor roles in an opera company that made its performances at the Teatro Tacón. He toured in Puerto Rico by 1840, then returned to Cuba, where he lived. Later he joined the opera company of Stefano Busatti, that finally led him to Puerto Rico in 1860. When the company disappeared he moved to Mayagüez, Puerto Rico. In Mayagüez he founded a new company of comedies: Compañía Dramática Astol (The Astol Drama Company). Fèlix Astol, was author of several pieces of popular music, but his most famous work was the dance Bellísima trigueña (Gorgeous brunette), composed in 1867. Conceived as a love song, it has had several versions throughout Latin America. In Cuba had the title of Mi amor (My love). In Brazil it was named Encantadora infancia (Lovely childhood). In Peru has two versions, one of them is named Bellísima peruana (Gorgeous Peruvian). In Haiti is danced and in Venezuela is well known too. But the most popular version is "La Borinqueña", adopted as the official anthem of Puerto Rico.

The revolutionary lyrics written by Lola Rodíguez de Tió a year after the composition of the danza, became the popular anthem. It was a time of great turbulence in Puerto Rico, as a nationalist revolution against Spain was sweeping across the political landscape. The lyrics were in keeping with that spirit.

However, the lyrics known and sung today are attributed to Manuel Fernández Juncos per the request of the new Commonwealth, as Lola's were yet again deemed too revolutionary.

He died in Mayagüez on 21 January 1901. He was buried at Cementerio Municipal Antiguo de Mayagüez.

== Bibliography ==
- Félix Astol Borinquen (La Borinqueña), danza, y aguinaldos populares del folklore de Puerto Rico. Para piano y canto en Espanol é Inglés, con acordes para la guitarra New York: Spanish Music Center, 1971 (OCLC 11156873)
- Francisco Zamora, Isabel Escabí Autógrafo: seres ordinarios con vidas extraordinarias. Guía del maestro San Juan: People Television, 1997
- Autógrafo : seres ordinarios con vidas extraordinarias. Volumen XIII: La Borinqueña [Vídeo] San Juan: People Television, Sistema Universitario Ana G. Mndez, 1997
- Monserrate Deliz El himno de Puerto Rico; estudio crítico de "La Borinqueña" Madrid: GIDA, 1957
