= Porto Rico (film) =

Upcoming drama film by Residente

- Directed by: René "Residente" Pérez Joglar
- Screenplay by: René "Residente" Pérez Joglar; Alexander Dinelaris Jr.
- Produced by: René "Residente" Pérez Joglar; Erick Douât; Edward Norton; Bill Migliore
- Starring: Benito "Bad Bunny" Martínez Ocasio; Viggo Mortensen; Edward Norton
- Cinematography: Anthony Dod Mantle
- Music by: Gyða Valtýsdóttir
- Production companies: 1868 Studios; Class 5 Films
- Country: United States
- Languages: English; Spanish

Porto Rico is an upcoming American historical drama film co-produced and directed by René "Residente" Pérez Joglar, who co-wrote the screenplay with Alexander Dinelaris Jr.

== Plot ==
The film is based on the life of Puerto Rican revolutionary José Maldonado Román, known as Águila Blanca (White Eagle), set in the late 19th century. Maldonado Román fought against colonialism by leading a gang of ex-convicts to vindicate Puerto Rico as it sought its identity as a country.

== Cast ==
- Benito "Bad Bunny" Martínez Ocasio
- Viggo Mortensen
- Edward Norton
- Richard Gadd
- Rhenzy Feliz
- Ismael Cruz Córdova
- Daniel Brühl
- Rubén Blades
- Alberto Guerra
- Óscar Jaenada
- Luis Tosar
- Carmen Machi
- Marcel Ruiz
- Arian Cartaya

== Production ==
It was announced in February 2023 that René "Residente" Pérez Joglar was to team with screenwriter Alexander Dinelaris Jr. to write a screenplay about Puerto Rican revolutionary José Maldonado Román. The project developed further in February 2026, when it was announced Joglar would be directing the film, with Benito "Bad Bunny" Martínez Ocasio, Viggo Mortensen, Edward Norton and Javier Bardem set to star. Alejandro González Iñárritu was announced to serve as an executive producer. Bardem exited the project by September due to scheduling conflicts, with Richard Gadd, Rhenzy Feliz, Daniel Brühl, and Rubén Blades among new cast additions announced.

Filming began in the Dominican Republic in August 2026.
