= Vidal Santiago Díaz =

Puerto Rican politician and independence advocate

- Born: January 1, 1910; Aguas Buenas, Puerto Rico
- Died: March 1982 (aged 72); Bayamón, Puerto Rico
- Political party: Puerto Rican Nationalist Party
- Movement: Puerto Rican independence movement

Notes
- Santiago Díaz was Pedro Albizu Campos' barber

Vidal Santiago Díaz (January 1, 1910 – March 1982) was a member of the Puerto Rican Nationalist Party and served as president of the Santurce Municipal Board of officers of the party. He was also the personal barber of Nationalist leader Pedro Albizu Campos. Though not involved in the Puerto Rican Nationalist Party Revolts of the 1950s, Santiago Díaz's barbershop was attacked by forty armed police officers and U.S. National Guardsmen. The attack was historic in Puerto Rico—the first time an event of that magnitude had ever been transmitted live via radio and heard all over the island.

== Early years ==
Santiago Díaz was born and raised in Aguas Buenas, Puerto Rico where he received his formal education. He later moved to Santurce, a mostly working-class section of San Juan, where he became a professional barber. Santiago Díaz was greatly troubled by the inhumanity and violence of the Ponce massacre. Nineteen were killed, including 1 policeman caught in the cross-fire. After reflecting on this police slaughter, and its moral implications, Santiago Díaz joined the Nationalist Party and became a follower of its president, Pedro Albizu Campos.

== Ponce massacre ==
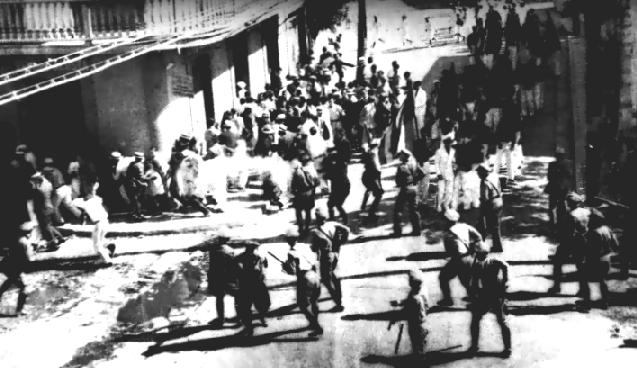
The Ponce massacre. Police kill 17 unarmed Puerto Ricans on Palm Sunday, including a 7-year-old girl, who was shot in the back.

On Palm Sunday, March 21, 1937, the Puerto Rican Nationalist Party held a peaceful march in the city of Ponce. This march was meant to commemorate the ending of slavery in Puerto Rico by the governing Spanish National Assembly in 1873. It also protested the imprisonment by the U.S. government of Nationalist leader Pedro Albizu Campos on charges of sedition.

The innocent Palm Sunday March turned into a police slaughter. Both march participants and innocent bystanders were fired upon by the Insular Police, resulting in the death of eighteen unarmed civilians and one policeman—every one from police fire as none of the civilians carried any firearms. In addition, some 235 civilians were wounded, including women and children. Journalists and photojournalists were present. The news was reported throughout the island the following day. Furthermore, a photo appeared in the newspaper El Imparcial, which was circulated to members of the U.S. Congress.

The Insular Police, a force resembling the National Guard, had been trained by U.S. military personnel. They were under the command of General Blanton Winship, the U.S.-appointed governor of Puerto Rico, who gave the order to attack the Ponce march on Palm Sunday.

== Salón Boricua ==
Santiago Díaz worked as a barber at 351 Calle Colton (Colton Street), Esquina Barbosa (at the corner of Barbosa Street) in Barrio Obrero in a shop called Salón Boricua. The word Boricua is synonymous with Puerto Rican and is a self-referential term which Puerto Ricans commonly employ. The word is derived from the words Borinquen and Borikén (the name which the native Taínos gave to the island before the arrival of the Spanish Conquistadors).

In his book War Against All Puerto Ricans, Denis states that Santiago Díaz purchased the barbershop in 1932 from José Maldonado Román, who was ailing from throat cancer, thus becoming the sole owner of the business. This has been disputed by several sources.

Salón Boricua was often frequented by José Grajales and Ramón Medina Ramírez, both leaders of the Nationalist Party of San Juan, and often served as a Nationalist meeting place. Santiago Díaz also befriended party leader and president Pedro Albizu Campos, who himself became a regular customer. Over time, Santiago Díaz became Albizu Campos' personal barber and one of his most trusted advisors.

== Events leading to the revolt ==
On May 21, 1948, a bill was introduced before the Puerto Rican Senate which would restrain the rights of the Independence and Nationalist movements on the archipelago. The Senate, which at the time was controlled by the Partido Popular Democrático (PPD) and presided by Luis Muñoz Marín, approved the bill. This bill, which resembled the anti-communist Smith Act passed in the United States in 1940, became known as the Ley de la Mordaza (Gag Law, technically "Law 53 of 1948") when the U.S.-appointed governor of Puerto Rico, Jesús T. Piñero, signed it into law on June 10, 1948.

Under this new law it became a crime to print, publish, sell, or exhibit any material intended to paralyze or destroy the insular government; or to organize any society, group or assembly of people with a similar destructive intent. It made it illegal to sing a patriotic song, and reinforced the 1898 law that had made it illegal to display the Flag of Puerto Rico, with anyone found guilty of disobeying the law in any way being subject to a sentence of up to ten years imprisonment, a fine of up to US$10,000 (equivalent to $134,000 in 2025), or both. According to Dr. Leopoldo Figueroa, a member of the Puerto Rico House of Representatives, the law was repressive and was in violation of the First Amendment of the United States Constitution which guarantees freedom of speech. He pointed out that the law as such was a violation of the civil rights of the people of Puerto Rico.

On June 21, 1948, Albizu Campos gave a speech in the town of Manatí, where Nationalists from all over the island had gathered in case the police attempted to arrest him. Later that month Albizu Campos visited Blanca Canales and her cousins Elio and Griselio Torresola, the nationalist leaders of the town of Jayuya. Griselio soon moved to New York City where he met and befriended Oscar Collazo.

== Uprisings ==
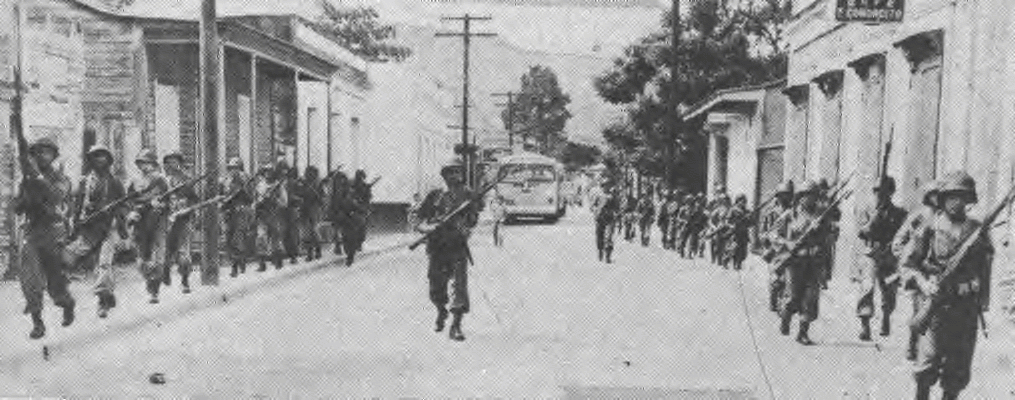
The National Guard, commanded by the Puerto Rico Adjutant General Major General Luis R. Estéves and under the orders of Gov. Luis Muñoz Marín, occupy Jayuya

From 1949 to 1950, the Nationalists on the island began to plan and prepare an armed revolt, hoping that the United Nations would take notice and intervene on their behalf. The revolution was to occur in 1952, on the day the United States Congress was to approve the creation of the Commonwealth of Puerto Rico (Estado Libre Asociado of Puerto Rico in Spanish; this translates into English as the Free Associated State of Puerto Rico). The reason behind Albizu Campos' call for an armed revolt was that he considered the "new" status a colonial farce.

The police disrupted this timetable and the Nationalist revolution was accelerated by two years. On October 26, 1950, Albizu Campos was holding a meeting in Fajardo when he received word that his house in San Juan was surrounded by police waiting to arrest him. He also was told that the police had already arrested other Nationalist leaders. He escaped from Fajardo and ordered the uprising to start.

The following day the police fired upon a caravan of Nationalists in the town of Peñuelas and killed four of them. This police massacre caused an immediate outcry.

The first armed confrontation of the Nationalist uprisings occurred early on the morning of October 29, in the Barrio Macaná of Peñuelas. The Insular Police surrounded the house of the mother of Melitón Muñiz Santos, the president of the Peñuelas Nationalist Party in Barrio Macaná, under the pretext that he was storing weapons for the Nationalist Revolt. Without warning, the police fired upon the Nationalists in the house and a firefight between both factions ensued, resulting in the death of two Nationalists and the wounding of six police officers. Nationalists Meliton Muñiz Santos, Roberto Jaume Rodríguez, Estanislao Lugo Santiago, Marcelino Turell, William Gutiérrez and Marcelino Berríos were arrested and accused of participating in an ambush against the local Insular Police.

The very next day, October 30, saw Nationalist uprisings throughout Puerto Rico, including Ponce, Mayagüez, Naranjito, Arecibo, Utuado (Utuado Uprising), Jayuya (Jayuya Uprising) and San Juan (San Juan Nationalist revolt).

Despite the turmoil caused by an island-wide revolt, all accurate news reports were prevented from spreading outside of Puerto Rico. Instead, the entire revolt was called "an incident between Puerto Ricans" .

== Gunfight at the Salón Boricua ==
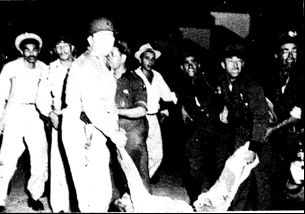
A wounded Vidal Santiago Díaz is carried out of his barbershop by the police and U.S. National Guard

Upon learning that the police wanted to arrest Albizu Campos, Santiago Díaz, who then was the president of the Santurce Municipal Board of Officers of the Puerto Rican Nationalist Party, sent a telegram to the Attorney General of Puerto Rico in the early hours of October 31, 1950, offering his services as an intermediary. He then opened his barbershop to await an answer which never arrived. Instead, unbeknown to Santiago Díaz, fifteen police officers and twenty-five National Guardsmen were sent that very afternoon to lay siege to his barbershop.

As they surrounded Salón Boricua, these forty armed men believed that a large group of Nationalists were inside and sent a police officer to investigate. Santiago Díaz believed that he was going to be shot by this officer and armed himself with a pistol. The situation escalated quickly. Santiago Díaz shot first and the police fired back—with machine guns, carbines, revolvers, and even grenades.

External audio
- You can hear a live radio broadcast of the assault on Salón Boricua on YouTube, via Radio WKAQ

The firefight lasted three hours. It finally ended when Santiago Díaz received five bullet wounds, one of them to the head. A staircase also collapsed on him. Outside in the street, two bystanders and a child were wounded.

This gun battle between forty heavily armed policemen and National Guardsmen and one barber made Puerto Rican radio history. It was the first time an event of this magnitude was transmitted live via the radio airwaves and the entire island was left in shock. The reporters who covered the event for Radio WKAQ and Radio WIAC were Luis Enrique "Bibí" Marrero, Víctor Arrillaga, Luis Romanacce and 18-year-old Miguel Ángel Álvarez.

Thinking he was dead, the attacking policemen dragged Santiago Díaz out of his barbershop. When they realized he was still alive, Santiago Díaz was sent to San Juan Municipal Hospital. He was hospitalized with fellow Nationalists Gregorio Hernández (who attacked La Fortaleza, the governor's mansion) and Jesús Pomales González (one of five Nationalists assigned to attack the Federal Court House).

== Aftermath ==
After the police assault at the Salón Boricua, Santiago Díaz recovered from most of his wounds but not from the gunshot to his head. Upon release from the hospital he was arrested and taken before a federal judge to face charges of "intent to commit murder" and other events related to the Nationalist uprisings of October 1950. Although he did not participate in the uprisings, he was convicted and sentenced to serve seventeen years and six months in prison at the Insular Penitentiary in Rio Piedras, Puerto Rico.

On October 14, 1952, Santiago Díaz was granted a pardon of all charges related to the cases concluded or pending against him by Puerto Rican Governor Luis Muñoz Marín. The governor specified that Santiago Díaz's activities on behalf of Puerto Rican independence were not to be curtailed, unless they advocated the use of anti-democratic methods, force, or violence. The pardon was conditional, under the supervision and control of the Insular Parole Board. Upon receiving this pardon, Santiago Díaz was immediately freed.

== Later years ==
Santiago Díaz never fully recovered from his head wound and moved with his wife to Santa Juanita, Bayamón. He ceased his political activities in the Puerto Rican Nationalist Party and became a member, and eventually a deacon, of the Disciples of Christ Church. Although he had some fingers missing and his head wound was very noticeable and impressive, he did work for many years as a barber in the barber shop of the "Hotel Capitol" in Miramar, San Juan, Puerto Rico. Santiago Díaz died in March 1982 at his home in Bayamón.

== See also ==
- Puerto Rican Nationalist Party Revolts of the 1950s
- Puerto Rican Nationalist Party
- Ponce massacre
- Río Piedras massacre
- Puerto Rican Independence Party
- List of Puerto Ricans
