= Manuel Fernández Juncos =

Spanish-born, Puerto Rican journalist, poet, author and humanitarian

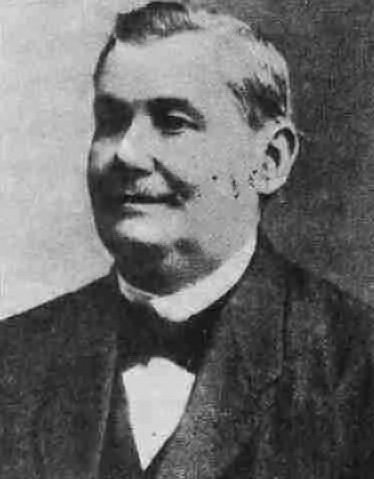
- Fernández Juncos wrote the lyrics to La Borinqueña, Puerto Rico's national anthem.

Background information
- Born: December 11, 1846; Tresmonte, Ribadesella, Asturias, Spain
- Died: August 18, 1928 (aged 81) San Juan, Puerto Rico
- Occupations: Journalist, poet, author, humanitarian

Manuel Fernández Juncos (December 11, 1846 – August 18, 1928) was a Spanish-born, Puerto Rican journalist, poet, author and humanitarian who wrote the official lyrics to La Borinqueña, Puerto Rico's official anthem.

== Early years ==
Fernández Juncos was born in Tresmonte, a section of Ribadesella, Asturias, Spain. Orphaned at an early age, he arrived in Puerto Rico in 1858 aboard a Spanish vessel. Fernández-Juncos became a Puerto Rican by adopting the island as his country and where he was to spend the rest of his life.

Fernández Juncos met Dr. José Gualberto Padilla, a poet known as "El Caribe" who inspired him towards a literary vocation. He first wrote for El Progreso (Progress), a newspaper founded by José Julián Acosta. He also wrote for the Porvenir and El Clamor del País newspapers. Fernández Juncos founded many newspapers with liberal tendencies. Among them, one was called El Buscapie. It promoted a socialist agenda, including the idea that every child should be entitled to a free education. It quickly became the most widely read Puerto Rican paper of its time. He also founded the Revista Puertorriqueña (The Puerto Rican Magazine).

As a writer, Fernández Juncos studied and wrote about the roots of the Puerto Ricans as a people. Among his most notable works were: Tipos y Caracteres, Libro Cuarto de Lectura, and Canciones Escolares (which he co-wrote with Virgilio Dávila and Braulio Dueño Colon). "El Buscapie" was the only newspaper in the island to criticize the local government. In 1893, he founded the Masonic Lodge Patria No. 61 in San Juan, Puerto Rico. He was also the Lodge's first Worshipful Master.

== Political activist ==
Fernández Juncos joined the Autonomist Party founded by Román Baldorioty de Castro and became its secretary. Shortly after, when Puerto Rico was granted its autonomy from Spain, Fernández Juncos was elected and became the first Secretary of State. However, in less than a year Puerto Rico was invaded by the United States during the Spanish–American War and its government abolished. He founded the Puerto Rican Red Cross, which continues today to give humanitarian help to those in need.

The Americanization process of Puerto Rico by the invaders included the establishment of English to be used in the local schools and the government. As such it was required that books written in English be used. Fernández Juncos, believed that it would not be beneficial to the common person in Puerto Rico who spoke only Spanish. He thereby took upon himself the task of adopting, translating, and writing the books to be used in the schools. Fernández-Juncos later founded the "Casa Manuel Fernández Juncos" for orphaned children in San Juan.

== "La Borinqueña" ==
Fernández Juncos wrote the current lyrics to "La Borinqueña", which originally was a danza written by Francisco Ramírez in 1860 (sometimes credited to Félix Astol Artés in 1867). The original lyrics to the anthem, written by Lola Rodríguez de Tió in 1868, were deemed by the government as too subversive for public use. A public contest to provide new lyrics to the tune was held in 1903, with Fernández Juncos as its winner (this explains why the Asturias native is credited for writing the lines "The land of Borinquen / where I was born"). "La Borinqueña" became the official anthem of the Commonwealth of Puerto Rico in 1952.

Official Anthem of the Commonwealth of Puerto Rico — "La Boriqueña"

External audio
- You may listen to Graciela Rivera's interpretation of Fernández Juncos' version of the "La Borinqueña" here on YouTube.

La tierra de Borinquen
donde he nacido yo
es un jardín florido
de mágico primor.

Un cielo siempre nítido
le sirve de dosel
y dan arrullos plácidos
las olas a sus pies.

Cuando a sus playas llegó Colón
Exclamó lleno de admiración:
"Oh!, oh!, oh!, esta es la linda tierra
que busco yo".

Es Borinquen la hija,
la hija del mar y el sol,
del mar y el sol,
del mar y el sol,
del mar y el sol,
del mar y el sol.

Translation:

The land of Borinquen
where I have been born
is a flowery garden
of magical beauty.

A constantly clear sky
serves as its canopy
and placid lullabies are sung
by the waves at its [Borinquen's] feet.

When at her beaches Columbus arrived
full of awe he exclaimed,
"Oh!, oh!, oh!, this is the lovely land
that I seek"

Borinquen is the daughter,
the daughter of the sea and the sun.
Of the sea and the sun,
of the sea and the sun,
of the sea and the sun,
of the sea and the sun.

== Legacy ==
Manuel Fernández Juncos died on August 18, 1928, in San Juan, Puerto Rico. Was buried at the Santa María Magdalena de Pazzis Cemetery In San Juan, Puerto Rico. The government of Puerto Rico has honored his memory by naming three schools in the cities of Mayagüez, Juana Diaz, and Cabo Rojo and a commercial avenue in San Juan after him.

A United States Postal Service Post Office in Santurce, Puerto Rico, was named the Fernandez Juncos Post Office.

== See also ==
- List of Puerto Ricans
