= Ponce massacre =

1937 police shooting in Puerto Rico

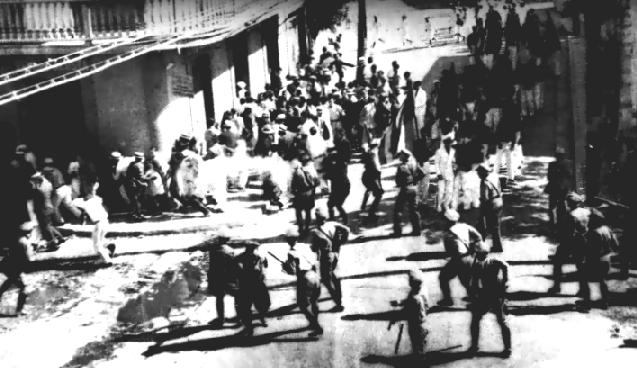
- Carlos Torres Morales, a photo journalist for the newspaper El Imparcial was covering the march and took this photograph when the shooting began.
- Location: 18°00′33.7″N 66°36′49.0″W; Ponce, Puerto Rico
- Date: March 21, 1937; 3:15 pm (EST)
- Target: Supporters of the Puerto Rican Nationalist Party
- Attack type: Massacre, mass shooting, police brutality
- Weapons: Thompson submachine guns, tear gas, machine guns, rifles, pistols
- Deaths: 17 civilians; one policeman and one National Guardsman (from friendly fire)
- Injuries: over 200 civilians wounded
- Perpetrator: Governor Blanton Winship via the Puerto Rico Insular Police

The Ponce massacre (Spanish: masacre de Ponce) took place on Palm Sunday, March 21, 1937, in Ponce, Puerto Rico, when a peaceful civilian march turned into a police shooting in which 17 civilians, one policeman and one National Guardsman were killed, and more than 200 civilians wounded. None of the civilians were armed and most of the dead were reportedly shot in their backs. The march had been organized by the Nationalist Party of Puerto Rico to commemorate the abolition of slavery in Puerto Rico by the governing Spanish National Assembly in 1873, and to protest the U.S. government's imprisonment of the Party's leader, Pedro Albizu Campos, on sedition charges.

An investigation led by the American Civil Liberties Union put the blame for the massacre squarely on the U.S.-appointed governor of Puerto Rico, Blanton Winship. Further criticism by members of the U.S. Congress led President Franklin D. Roosevelt to remove Winship as governor in 1939.

Governor Winship was never prosecuted for the massacre and no one under his chain of command – including the police who took part in the event, and admitted to the mass shooting – were prosecuted or reprimanded.

The Ponce massacre remains the largest massacre in U.S. imperial history in Puerto Rico. It has been the source of many articles, books, paintings, films, and theatrical works.

== Chronology of events ==
Several days before the scheduled Palm Sunday march, the Nationalists had received legal permits for a peaceful protest from José Tormos Diego, the mayor of Ponce. According to a 1926 Puerto Rico Supreme Court ruling, government permits were not necessary for the use of plazas, parks or streets for meetings or parades. As a courtesy to the Ponce municipal government, the Nationalists nevertheless requested the permit.

Upon learning about the march, the U.S.-appointed governor of Puerto Rico, General Blanton Winship, ordered the new Insular Police Chief, Colonel Enrique de Orbeta, to contact Mayor Tormos and have him cancel the parade permit. He ordered the police chief to increase the police force in the southern city, and to stop, "by all means necessary", any demonstration conducted by the Nationalists in Ponce. Without notice to the organizers, or any opportunity to appeal, or any time to arrange an alternate venue, the permits were abruptly withdrawn, just before the protest was scheduled to begin.

Following Governor Winship's orders, Colonel de Orbeta went to Ponce where he concentrated police units from across the island sporting "the latest riot control equipment", among which he included the machine gunners in the island. Winship intended to crush the activities of the Nationalists and their leader, Pedro Albizu Campos.

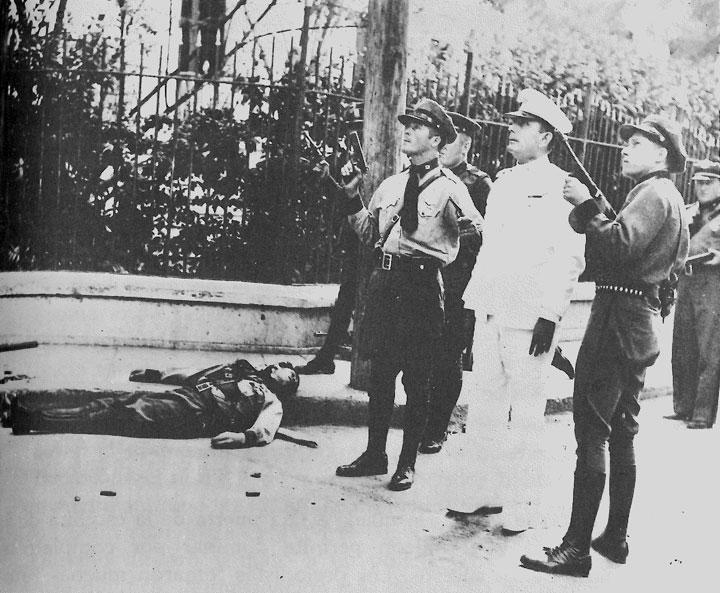
Police chief De Orbeta and Insular Police officers, immediately after the massacre

The Insular Police, a force somewhat resembling the National Guard, was under the direct military command of Governor Winship. Ultimate responsibility for the massacre fell on Winship, who controlled the National Guard and Insular Police, "and ordered the massacre."

Police Chief Guillermo Soldevilla of the municipality of Juana Díaz, with 14 policemen, took a position in front of the marchers. Chief Perez Segarra and Sgt. Rafael Molina, commanding nine policemen armed with Thompson submachine guns and tear gas bombs, stood in the back. Chief of Police Antonio Bernardi, heading 11 policemen armed with machine guns, stood in the east; and another group of 12 police, armed with rifles, was placed in the west. According to some reports, police numbered "over 200 heavily armed" guards.

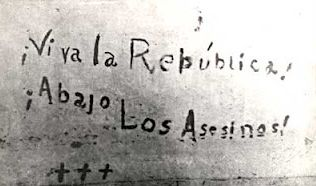
The "¡Viva la República, Abajo los Asesinos!" message which cadet Bolívar Márquez Telechea wrote with his blood before he died.

As La Borinqueña, Puerto Rico's national song, was being played, the Ponce branch of the Cadets of the Republic under the command of Tomás López de Victoria and the rest of the demonstrators began to march.

The Insular Police started firing on the marchers – killing 17 unarmed civilians, two policemen, and wounding over 200 civilians, including women and children. Police firing went on for over 15 minutes. The dead included 17 men, one woman, and a young girl. Some of the dead were demonstrators/cadets, while others were passersby. As of 2009, only two survivors were known to be alive, siblings Fernando and Beatriz Vélez.

The flag-bearer of the Cadets of the Republic was shot and killed during the massacre. A young girl, Carmen Fernández proceeded to take the flag, but was shot and gravely injured. A young Nationalist cadet named Bolívar Márquez dragged himself to the wall of Santo Asilo de Damas and wrote with his blood the following message before dying:

"¡Viva la República, Abajo los asesinos!"

("Long live the Republic, Down with the Murderers!")

Many were chased by the police and shot or clubbed at the entrance of their houses as they tried to escape. Others were taken from their hiding places and killed. Leopold Tormes, a member of the Puerto Rico legislature, claimed to reporters that a policeman had murdered a nationalist with his bare hands. Dr. José Gandara, a physician who assisted the wounded, testified that wounded people running away were shot, and that many were again wounded by the clubs and bare fists of the police. No arms were found in the hands of the civilians wounded, nor on the dead ones. About 150 of the demonstrators were arrested immediately afterward; they were later released on bail.

== Official version of the events ==
The next day, Winship radioed Washington and reported, officially, that the Nationalists had initiated the shooting. Part of his radiogram report stated that "two shots were fired by the Nationalists ... with Nationalists firing from the street, and from roofs and balconies on both sides of the street ... [the police] showed great patience, consideration and understanding of the situation, as did the officers and men under him [the Police Chief]."

The following day, as a result of this misinformation, the New York Times and Washington Post reported that a Nationalist political revolt had claimed the lives of more than eighteen people in Puerto Rico.

The Puerto Rican senator Luis Muñoz Marín traveled to the city of Ponce to investigate the event. After examining the photograph taken by Carlos Torres Morales of El Imparcial, which had not yet been published, he wrote a letter to Ruth Hampton, an official at the Department of the Interior. He said that the photograph showed that the policemen were not shooting at the uniformed Nationalists (Cadets), but at a terrified crowd in full flight.

== Investigation and the Hays Commission ==
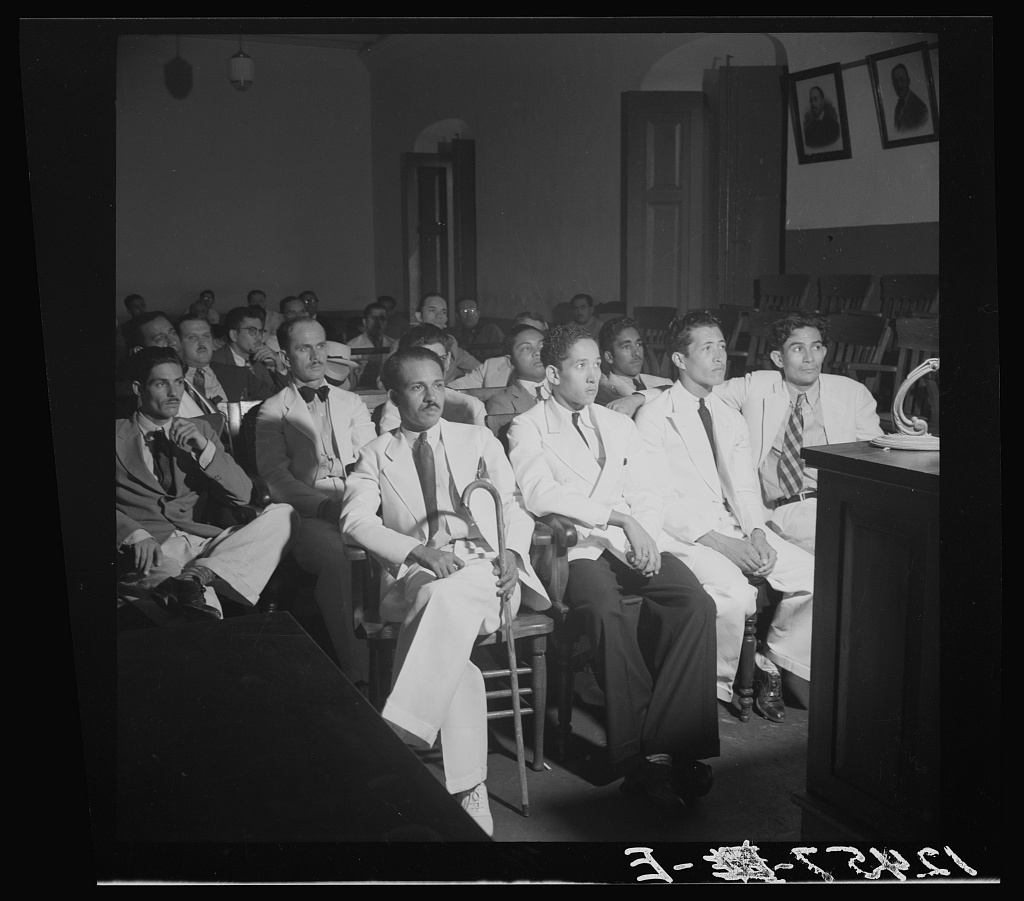
Defendants during the trial of the Nationalists at the former Spanish Army barracks in Ponce, Puerto Rico (December 1937).

Initial investigations of the event differed on whether the police or the marchers fired the first shots. Governor Winship applied pressure on the district attorney's office in charge of the investigation. He requested that the public prosecutor from Ponce, Rafael Pérez Marchand, "arrest more Nationalists", and that no charges be filed against the police. The prosecutor resigned as a result of being denied the opportunity to conduct a proper investigation.

A Puerto Rican government investigation into the incident drew few conclusions. A second, independent investigation took place by a committee, the Commission of Inquiry on Civil Rights in Puerto Rico, led by the ACLU's Arthur Garfield Hays, with as its further members prominent Puerto Rican citizens Fulgencio Piñero, Emilio Belaval, José Davila Rice, Antonio Ayuyo Valdivieso, Manuel Díaz García, and Francisco M. Zeno. This investigation concluded that the events on 21 March constituted a massacre and mob action by the police. The report harshly criticized the repressive tactics and massive civil rights violations by Governor Winship.

After viewing the photograph taken by Carlos Torres Morales, Hays in his report to the American Civil Liberties Union questioned why the governor's investigation had not used the photography, which was among two that were widely published. According to Hays, the photograph clearly showed 18 armed policeman at the corner of Aurora and Marina streets, ready to fire upon a group of innocent bystanders. The image showed the white smoke in the barrel of a policeman's revolver as he fired upon the unarmed people. The Hays Commission questioned why the policemen fired directly at the crowd, and not at the Nationalist Cadets.

== Casualties ==
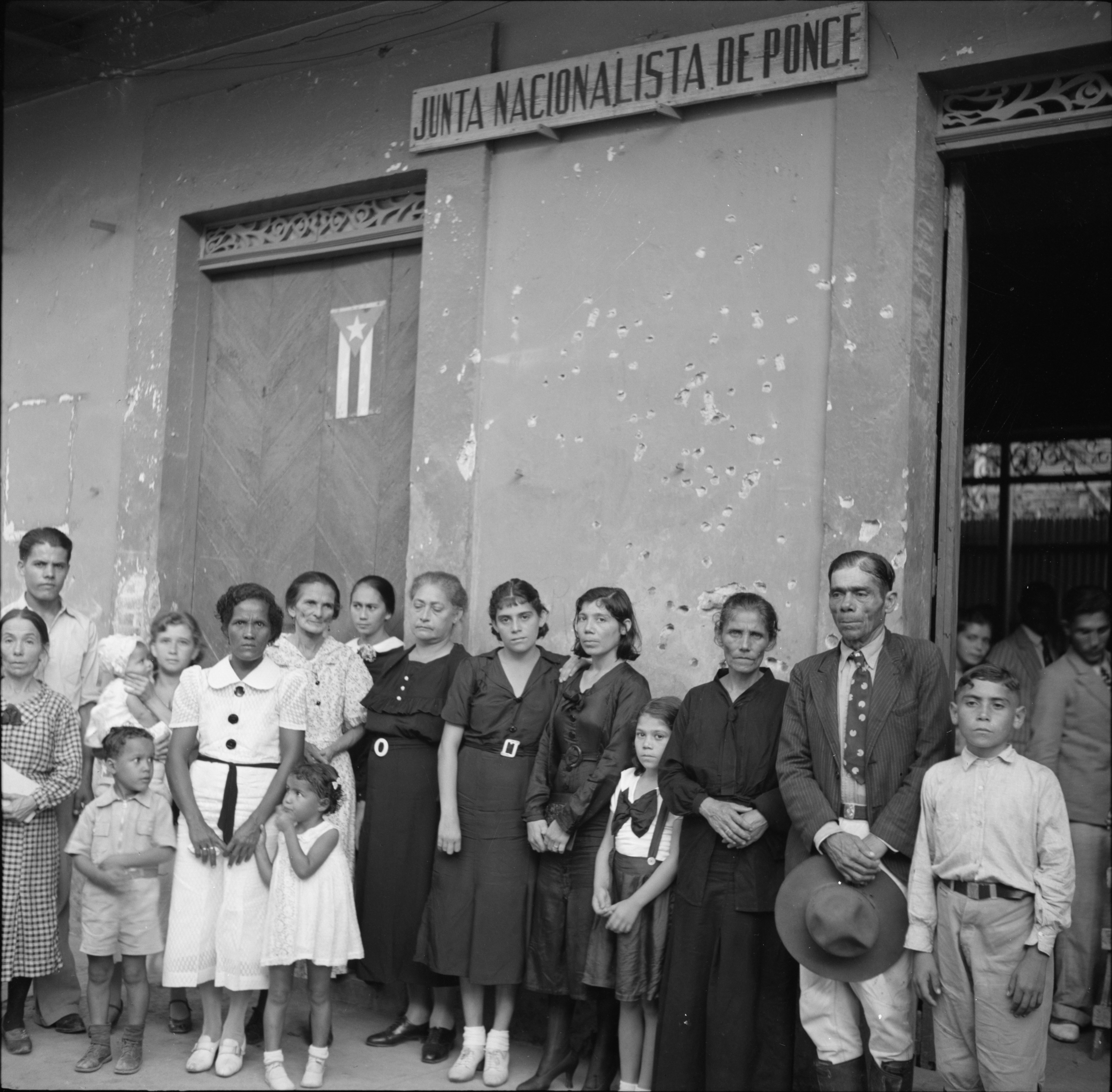
Relatives of those killed in the Ponce massacre standing by the police bullet-ridden wall at the Nationalist Party headquarters in Ponce.

The following are the names of those killed:

- Cotal Nieves, Juan Delgado
- Hernández de Rosario, María
- Jiménez Morales, Luis
- Loyola López, Ceferino (Insular Police Officer)
- Maldonado, Georgina (12-year-old)
- Márquez Telechea, Bolívar
- Ortiz Toro, Ramón
- Perea, Ulpiano
- Delgado Pietrantoni, José Antonio (National Guard)
- Reyes Rivera, Juan
- Rivera López, Conrado
- Rodríguez Figueras, Iván G.
- Rodríguez Méndez, Jenaro
- Rodríguez Rivera, Pedro Juan
- Rosario, Obdulio
- Sánchez Pérez, Eusebio (Insular Police Officer)
- Santos Ortiz, Juan
- Torres Gregory, Juan
- Vélez Torres, Teodoro

== Aftermath ==
=== Lack of convictions ===
In the aftermath of the massacre, no police officer was convicted or sentenced to jail. No police were demoted or suspended and Governor Winship never issued a public apology.

=== Reaction in the U.S. Congress ===
The Ponce massacre reverberated through the U.S. Congress. On the House floor, Congressman John T. Bernard expressed his shock and outrage. He said: "The police in Ponce, probably with the encouragement of the North American police chief and even the governor, opened fire on a Palm Sunday Nationalist march, killing seventeen and wounding more than two hundred."

Congressman Vito Marcantonio joined in the criticism, filing charges against Governor Winship with President Roosevelt. In his speech before Congress titled "Five Years of Tyranny", Congressman Vito Marcantonio reported that "Ex-Governor Blanton Winship, of Puerto Rico, was summarily removed by the President of the United States on May 12, 1939" after charges were filed against Mr. Winship with the President. In his speech, the Congressman detailed the number of killings by the police and added, "the facts show that the affair of March 21 in Ponce was a massacre ... Governor Winship tried to cover up this massacre by filing a mendacious report" and the congressman called Governor Winship a "tyrant".

=== Attempt on Governor Winship's life ===
The year following the Ponce massacre, on 25 July 1938, Governor Winship wanted to mark the anniversary of the U.S. 1898 invasion of Puerto Rico with a military parade. He chose the city of Ponce to demonstrate that his "Law and Order" policy had been successful against the Nationalists. During the parade, shots were fired at the grandstand where Winship and his officials were sitting in an attempt to assassinate him. It was the first time that an attempt was made on the life of a Governor of Puerto Rico. Winship escaped unharmed but two men, the assailant and a police officer, were killed, and 36 people were wounded.

The dead were the Nationalist Ángel Esteban Antongiorgi and National Guard Colonel Luis Irizarry. The Nationalist Party denied participation in the attack, but the government arrested several Nationalists and accused nine of "murder and conspiracy to incite violence." Among the nine Nationalists charged and convicted were Tomás López de Victoria, captain of the Ponce branch of the Cadets of the Republic, and fellow cadets Elifaz Escobar, Santiago González Castro, Juan Pietri and Prudencio Segarra. They served eight years in the Puerto Rico State Penitentiary. The four were pardoned by the next full-term U.S.-appointed governor, Rexford Tugwell.

Winship tried to repress the Nationalists. Jaime Benítez Rexach, a student at the University of Chicago at the time and later long-time chancellor of the University of Puerto Rico, wrote to President Roosevelt stating, "Governor [Winship] himself through his military approach to things has helped keep Puerto Rico in an unnecessary state of turmoil. He seems to think that the political problem of Puerto Rico limits itself to a fight between himself and the Nationalists, that no holds are barred in that fight and that everybody else should keep out." Winship was replaced in 1939.

== Legacy ==
=== ACLU chapter ===
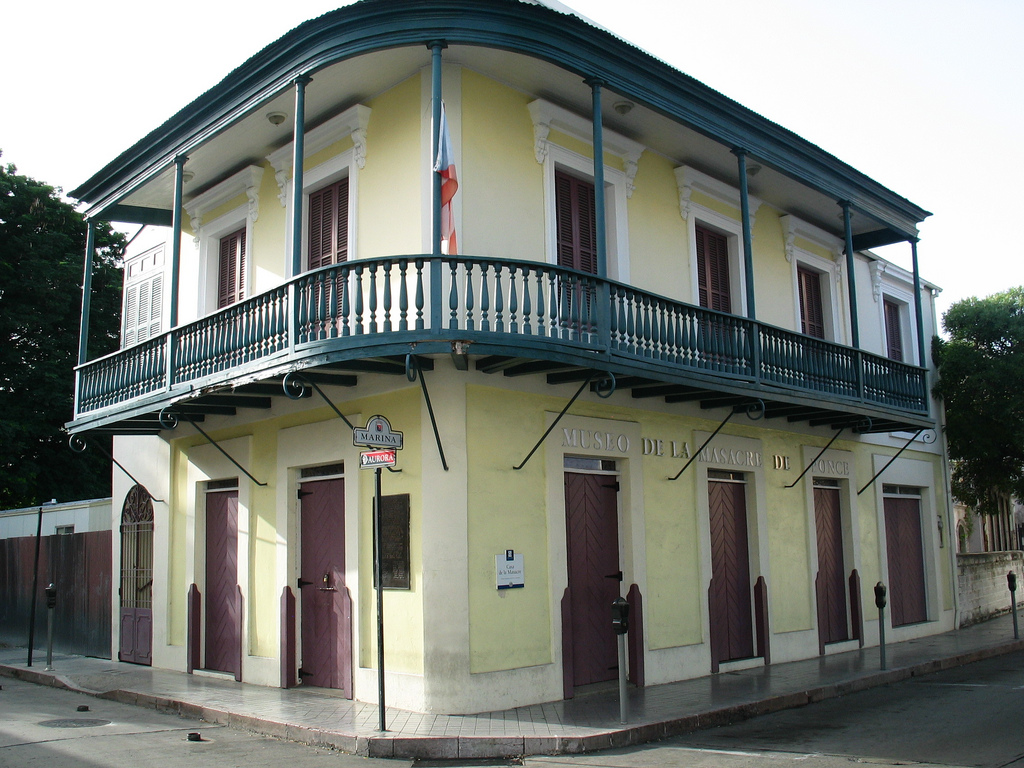
The Ponce Massacre Museum in Ponce

External videos
- Newsreel scenes related to the Ponce massacre Here

One of the by-products of the Ponce Massacre and the Hays Commission was the creation in Puerto Rico of a chapter of the ACLU on May 21, 1937. It was named "Asociación Puertorriqueña de Libertades Civiles" (Puerto Rican Association of Civil Liberties). Its first president was Tomás Blanco, Felipe Colón Díaz and Antonio Fernós Isern were its vice-presidents, the treasurer was Inés María Mendoza, the Secretary was attorney Vicente Géigel Polanco, and the association's legal counsel was attorney Ernesto Ramos Antonini. Luis Muñoz Marin and many leaders from Ponce, including attorney Pérez Marchand and some of the members of the Hays Commission were also among the founders.

Today, the Ponce massacre is commemorated annually.

The main consequence of the Ponce Massacre, like the main consequence of the other episodes of state terrorism in the history of our people, is the fear that has been planted into the people of Puerto Rico, the fear that has come to form part of the life of our people, regarding the idea of the struggle for independence. The people of Puerto Rico has, [sic] for the most part, reached the conclusion, as a result of those episodes, that to be an independentista is dangerous, that to be indepedentista means persecution, damage to the person, serious financial difficulties. As a result, that has diminished the rank and file for the ideology of independence and has made very difficult the growth of the independence ideology in Puerto Rico."

Ponce Massacre Museum The Institute of Puerto Rican Culture, an agency of the Government of Puerto Rico, operates the Ponce Massacre Museum. It is located at the intersection where the events took place (corner of Marina and Aurora streets). The museum houses photographs and various artifacts from the Ponce massacre. A section of the museum is dedicated to Pedro Albizu Campos.

=== In popular culture ===
The book Revolucion en el Infierno (Revolution in Hell) was published in 2002, and the television film by the same name was released in 2004. It illustrates the events of the Ponce massacre through the life of one of the victims, Ulpiano Perea. The film is an adapted from the playwright by Roberto Ramos Perea, Ulpiano's nephew.

== See also ==
- Casimiro Berenguer
- Grito de Lares
- Intentona de Yauco
- List of revolutions and rebellions
- Truman assassination attempt
- Puerto Rican Nationalist Party Revolts of the 1950s
- Puerto Rican Independence Party
- Río Piedras massacre
- Lists of killings by law enforcement officers in the United States
