= Tresmonte =

Coordinates: 43.466667°N 5.983333°W

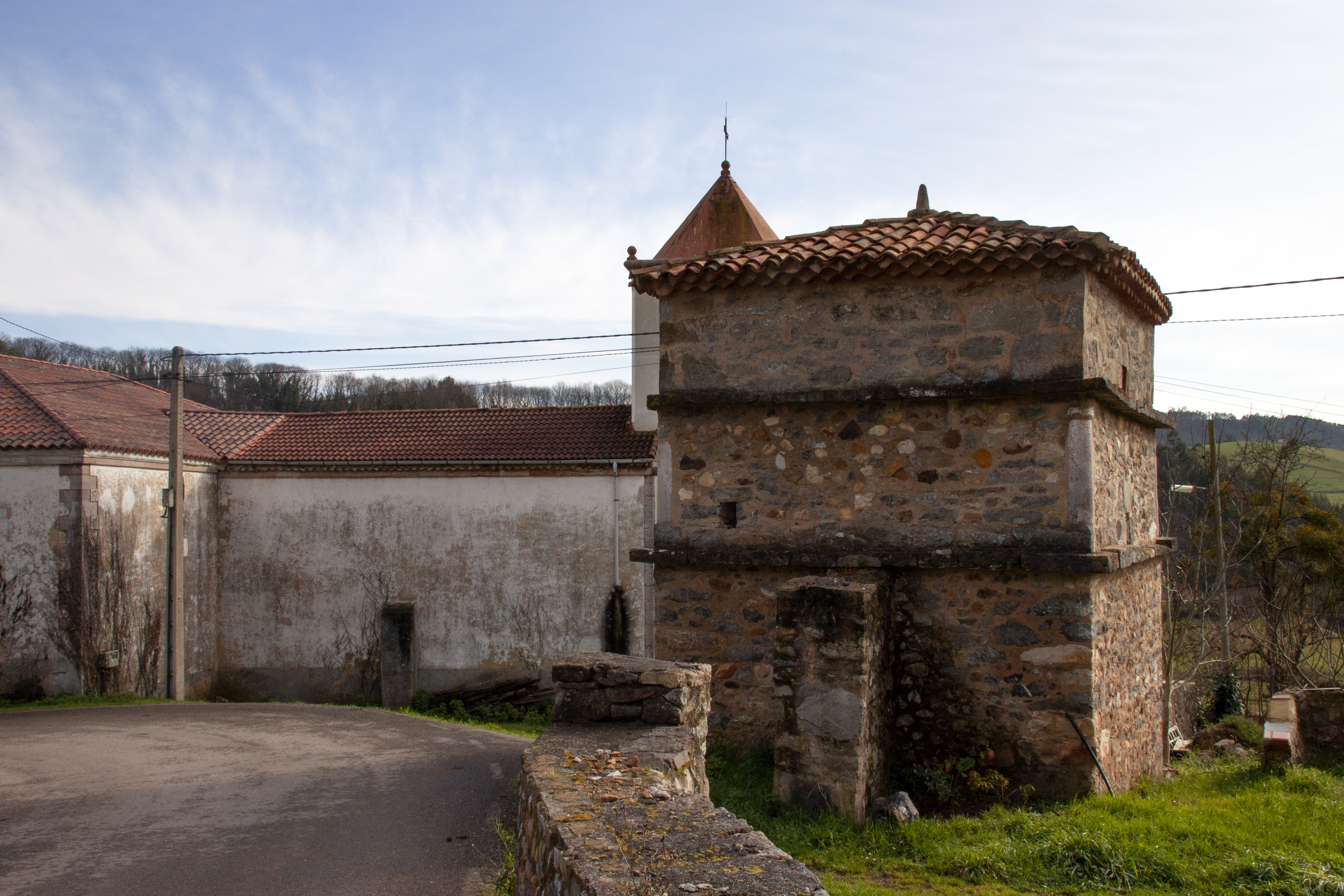
Trasmonte, Spain

Tresmonte (Spanish: Trasmonte) is one of six parishes (administrative divisions) in Les Regueres, a municipality within the province and autonomous community of Asturias, in northern Spain.

The population is 308 (INE 2011).

== Villages ==
- Agüera
- Cogollu
- Granda
- Llandriu
- Les Cruces
- Pravia
- Premió
