= José Maldonado Román =

Puerto Rican outlaw

José "Águila Blanca" Maldonado
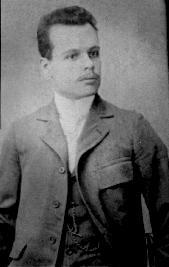
- Known surviving portrait, c. 1890.
- Born: 1872; Juana Díaz, Puerto Rico
- Died: 1932 (aged 59–60); San Juan, Puerto Rico

José Maldonado (March 18, 1872 – January 17, 1932), a.k.a. "Águila Blanca" (White Eagle), was a Puerto Rican outlaw and revolutionary who fought in Cuba alongside the Cuban Revolutionary Committee in the late-19th century and a controversial folk icon. He was known within the jurisdictions of Juana Díaz and Ponce. He claimed his first arrest was at the age of eleven, though without stating the charge for this arrest was that of theft.

Maldonado had serious and repeated encounters with the Spanish provincial justice system throughout his life. Historical accounts describe him as being imprisoned for offenses including theft, robbery, assault, and attempts against the authority. By the mid-1890s, he had developed an extensive criminal record and had spent significant periods in prison. At the time, contemporary newspapers portrayed him as a bandit, while the more revolutionary press, which was experiencing a resurgence, interpreted his actions through a different lens. In 1898, he wrote his own autobiography, which he managed to have serialized in a newspaper. (Note: It is currently unknown how plausible the story penned by José Maldonado Román might be. His own account of events recounts his life, beginning with his first imprisonment at the age of eleven and concluding with his return to Puerto Rico following the American invasion, without ever pinpointing a single, definitive date or location. Historians and academics can only deduce when particular events took place, as Maldonado does provide direct references to historical figures from that era, such as Aniceto Lerma, who served as the warden of the Ponce Public Prison until 1897. The question that inevitably arises is whether Maldonado might have been somewhat dishonest in the letter he wrote to Eugenio Deschamps, which was later forwarded to American military authorities. In December 1898, Maldonado was seeking a pardon for all the crimes he had committed under Spanish rule. For this reason, he emphasized (in several passages of his autobiographical letter) his hatred toward the Spaniards from the Iberian Peninsula, particularly given that the Spanish Crown was the enemy of the United States at the time. Ultimately, Maldonado did obtain a pardon, which American authorities referred to as a "safe passport" or, on occasion, "safe conduct," by making use of this correspondence.)

During this era, the economic situation for the common laborer was a difficult one. Most of the land was owned by wealthy landlords, loyal to the Spanish Crown, who at times were cruel and did not provide any type of medical or basic rights to their workers. The provincial government maintained a strong police and military presence, and political tensions were growing among autonomists, separatists, revolutionaries, and supporters of continued Spanish rule (referred to as either "the unconditionals" or "conservatives").

The most important transformation in Maldonado's historical image happened after he participated in the failed 1897 uprising at Yauco before the events of 1898. That was the year the United States invaded Puerto Rico, ending more than four centuries of Spanish provincial rule. His involvement in such revolt helped, in a way, transform his reputation from that of a mere rural criminal into that of a potential political rebel. Popular oral stories describe the Águila Blanca character as a type of Robin Hood jíbaro (peasant Robin Hood) who always robbed from the wealthy and gave back to the poor. (Note: On White Eagle, in popular literature see "Breve historia de José Maldonado, alias 'White Eagle,' Noble Hijo de Villalba, Defensor de la Independencia de Puerto Rico," in "La Literatura popular," La Revista del Centro de Estudios Avanzados de Puerto Rico y el Caribe 1 (1985).) Some accounts even attribute extraordinary characteristics and near-mythical abilities to him. But historians have emphasized that these stories should not automatically be treated as literal history.

Maldonado died in 1932 from throat cancer at his home in Toa Baja, San Juan.

== Early life ==
Maldonado (birth name: José María Maldonado Román) was born in Villalba, in the Hato Puerco neighborhood within the jurisdiction of Juana Díaz, on March 18, 1872, when Puerto Rico was still a Spanish province. He was the acknowledged son of Félix Maldonado and María Josefa Román. On his father’s side, he was the grandson of Don Ignacio Maldonado and Doña María Romana Fernández. He was baptized in the parish church of Juana Díaz, and his godparents were Don Genaro Villaronga and Doña Cándida Villaronga.

José’s family had not always been poor. His parents supposedly owned land in Juana Díaz, and prominent men within the City of Ponce held him in high regard, as well.

Apart from that detail, his descendants knew little (and had very little information) about José Maldonado’s childhood.

José Maldonado was eleven years old when he was arrested for the first time; he spent two years in jail until a judge, presumably convinced of his innocence, acquitted him. Five days after being released, Maldonado got into a fight with a police informant and was arrested once again, this time he remained in custody for only a few days.

Realizing that things would not go well for him in Ponce, Maldonado moved to Juana Díaz, where his mother still lived, but he found no peace there either. After being insulted by a "negrito" (young Black man), Maldonado shot and wounded him, for which he was sentenced to three years and two months in prison. According to Maldonado's own biography, that period was a true ordeal, largely due to the treatment he received from the warden, who was extremely harsh.

Maldonado was released from prison, and a few days later, a big lawyer named Adolfo Sánchez Cotorruelo was murdered. (This took place in 1893). Before being a lawyer, Cotorruelo had been a member of the Spanish Volunteer Corps for many years. Through various intrigues, suspicion was cast upon Maldonado, and he was imprisoned once again, confined to a cell, shackled in irons and chains. Whenever Maldonado was brought a meager portion of food, he claimed "I had to light a candle just to be able to see it and eat."

One night, district prosecutor Don Jesús Calvo Romeral appeared before Maldonado, offering him 500 pesos in cash if he would reveal the identity of the murderer. Maldonado refused the money, maintaining that he knew nothing. In response, Romeral allegedly ordered that buckets of water be thrown into Maldonado's cell and that six men beat him every single night. Having failed to extract any information, Maldonado was handed over to the judge, Don Herminio Díaz Navarro, who, upon confirming his innocence, ordered his release. But the guards were instructed to give Maldonado no peace; consequently, he returned to Juana Díaz to stay with his mother.

While Maldonado was living there, and harassed by the police, an attempt was allegedly made on his life. A man simply known as "Carabuco" was sent to kill him, with a promise of 500 pesos in exchange. This hired killer attacked him one day with a knife, but Maldonado managed to fight back, disarm him, and wound him. Following this, the entire police force was mobilized against him.

Upon escaping into Ponce, an unknown gentleman intervened and resolved the matter, securing Maldonado's freedom.

A few days later, Maldonado was summoned by the police chief inspector, who offered him forty pesos per month if he would work as a spy. Maldonado rejected the proposal, stating that he would not serve a government that had mistreated him so badly. From that moment on, more attempts were allegedly made on Maldonado's life. The police chief found Jesús Marcano, who was a bandit from Guayama, and gave him the task of selling stolen jewelry to Maldonado, so he could arrest and charge him under false pretenses. Maldonado bought the jewelry for eight pesos, apparently unaware that they were stolen. Then he was caught and afterwards sentenced to prison, according to Maldonado's story.

Maldonado later became known among his friends either as Don "Pepe" or by the nicknames "Águila Blanca" (White Eagle) and "Águila Azul" (Blue Eagle).

== Outlaw years ==
Before the invasion, José Maldonado had been one of the most prominent figures among a group of young prisoners accused of committing various robberies and assaults in the late-1800s.

According to the criminal record summarized in La Democracia (a local political newspaper at the time), Maldonado served a prison sentence between June 19, 1887 and January 19, 1889, for theft. On April 10, 1890, he was jailed for assault and released on March 20, 1891. On February 7, 1891, he began serving a sentence for attempted murder, but was pardoned on November 30, 1892. On September 28, 1893, he was imprisoned for robbery and released on October 3 of the same year by order of a judge. In February of 1894, José Maldonado broke into a house in the City of Ponce with the intent to commit larceny, but was later apprehended. He was incarcerated on March 2 for robbery and transferred to the penitentiary on February 7, 1895. This criminal record shows another arrest warrant (dated March 3 of the same year) for the crime of causing bodily injury; he was released on June 22 due to a pardon.

Maldonado, who frequented the areas of Juana Díaz and Ponce, continued his assault and robbing spree none the wiser. On October 25, 1895, he was jailed on fraud charges and released on November 2. On March 13, 1896, he was prosecuted for fraud and released on May 26. On March 21, 1898, he was imprisoned for attempted murder, although the date of his release and/or escape is unknown.

But according to the actual, official conviction casebook, on October 3, 1894, Maldonado was sentenced in Ponce to four years in prison for robbery. On December 26, he received another four-year sentence for the same crime, and on January 22, 1895, a third sentence, also for robbery, was imposed upon him. He was sent to prison from Ponce on February 7, 1895, and escaped in Coamo on the night of the 8th, though he was recaptured on the 13th. Because of this escape, an additional term of seven months and fifteen days were added to his sentence in February of 1897.

On the night of March 14, 1897, while being transported from Ponce to the prison in San Juan, he escaped after breaking through the floor of the Aibonito jail.

In Maldonado's own words:

... I was being taken to the capital, clamped and guarded by Civil Guards. But upon reaching Aibonito, outraged by the injustice and the insults I had endured along the way, I decided to risk everything and made my escape, heading into the mountains. There, I encountered other fugitives. And in response, they unleashed the police force in pursuit of me, intent on killing me. Despite this, I managed to make my way back to the jurisdiction of Ponce.

Some weeks later, and while Maldonado was working in a sugarcane field, he was approached by Ramón Ramos, an ex-convict and formerly a member of Maldonado's gang, who carried a letter from José Pamblanco (a well-known leader of another criminal gang active in the 1890s) addressed to him. In the letter, Pamblanco stated that the time had come "for them to make some real money" and that, to achieve this, Maldonado was to kill the individuals listed in an attachment: Julio Rivas, for whose death 500 pesos were offered; Abelardo Moscoso, Eugenio Deschamps, and Agustín F. Morales, for whom a total of 6,000 pesos were offered; 3,000 pesos for Luis Muñoz Rivera; and 400 for one Avelino González. The payment would be made as each murder was carried out.

Maldonado sent word back to Pamblanco: "Had he come to make this proposal himself, rather than sending someone else, he would not have made it back to Ponce alive."

In retaliation, Pamblanco allied himself with the Civil Guard, eventually managing to corner Maldonado at another sugarcane field in the jurisdiction of Juana Díaz. After three days of going hungry, Maldonado decided to come out of his hiding spot, which triggered a shooting that ended with their retreat, though not before Maldonado managed to wound one of his pursuers.

During that time, some kind-hearted gentlemen from Ponce gave Maldonado (who remained in hiding) about 300 pesos, which he spent on clothing. However, after he entrusted these items to a "negrito" named Emilio, the latter handed them over to the local police chief, leaving Maldonado with nothing. Sometime later, Maldonado sought the man out; upon finding him at the corner of Unión and Vives streets (in Ponce), Maldonado shot at him twice, leaving him for dead. The police then opened fire on Maldonado, forcing him to flee into the countryside. There, Maldonado was caught off guard by two pairs of police officers who began firing at him. He fired back with his revolvers, wounding one of them and causing the others to flee.

== 1897 Revolts ==
Prior to the U.S. invasion of 1898, coffee production in Puerto Rico’s central mountain range had grown by leaps and bounds since the 1870s, driven by the favorable prices the industry commanded in foreign markets. The availability of fertile, inexpensive land, new roads providing access to the interior, machinery (albeit primitive) for processing the beans, and (not to be overlooked) an abundant supply of cheap day-laborer manpower, all stimulated investment in the plantation industry.

This boom, however, was driven by the strong prices that Puerto Rican coffee commanded in European and Cuban markets during the mid-1890s. Yet, supply did not seem to keep pace with demand. By 1898, many coffee growers were deeply in debt to the commercial firms that had lent them capital (at high interest rates) to build mills for processing the beans or to expand their existing plantations. It was a sustained boom, but one built upon debt.

Although large estates did not account for the bulk of total production, they did control the processing and marketing of the product. Numerous small-scale producers obtained credit at the estate owners' stores and subsequently settled their debts with hulled coffee beans.

Sugar and coffee dominated, though they did not monopolize, the island’s economy. The livelihoods of many families were also tied to the manufacture of cigars and cigarettes in small and medium-sized artisanal workshops located in the towns. Fishing, for instance, played a role in the nation’s economy. Salt production and construction followed, rounding out the economic landscape.

Yet the life of the ordinary citizen remained precarious, a fact well understood by the general government of the Province of Puerto Rico. Labor strikes were prohibited by law, and dismissals were entirely arbitrary. Furthermore, being fired could also mean losing one’s home, as many dwellings were provided by the plantations, estates whose owners already controlled a vast portion of the land. In rural areas, collective efforts to secure better working conditions and fairer treatment often resulted in protests marked by a lack of coordination. Instead of directing their actions against the landowners (their own employers) many day laborers ended up confronting the police. Even the liberal newspapers of the time did not know how to support these protests. Quite simply, the day laborers lacked the means to advocate for their own rights.

In the years following the failure of the Grito de Lares (Cry of Lares), pockets of resistance against the Spanish authorities continued to emerge. Protests, disturbances, and clashes were reported in towns such as Las Marías, Adjuntas, Utuado, Vieques, Bayamón, Ciales, and Palo Seco, in Toa Baja.

During the final decade of the 19th century, associations were founded with the explicit purpose of redressing injustices, much to the dismay of the ruling class, whether they favored the monarchy or, conversely, independence. Labor movements resonated with increasing intensity in the ears of those who governed the island. These causes gradually created fissures in the social structure, which had been built upon the fragile foundations of a monoculture-based economy. The political aspirations of those seeking sovereignty could no longer be concealed, let alone disguised.

On December 8, 1895, the Revolutionary Committee of Puerto Rico was founded in New York with the goal of securing the island's independence through armed struggles. This group became part of the Cuban Revolutionary Committee, operating under the name of "Puerto Rico Section." Among its most significant contributions was the design of the Puerto Rican flag, which was inspired by the Cuban flag, though with the colors inverted.

In early December of 1896, an attempted revolutionary coup led by Mateo Mercado was uncovered in the Barinas neighborhood of Yauco. Once the plot was discovered, the Civil Guard arrested numerous prominent individuals from Yauco, as well as other residents from neighboring areas, on the grounds that they were involved in the movement and belonged to secret societies dedicated to the separatist cause. In addition to Mercado, those arrested included Darío and Carlos Franceschi, Emiliano Lavergne, and Antonio Mattei Lluberas.

In 1897, the last serious attempt at a separatist revolt took place in Puerto Rico.

The attempt was part of a larger plan devised by the Revolutionary Committee of Puerto Rico, spearheaded by the Yauco-based landowner Antonio Mattei Lluberas, alongside the Dominican general Agustín Morales, Manuel Catalá, Juan Roig, Gerardo Forrest Vélez, Guillermo Velázco, Eduardo Lugo Viñas, Félix Matos Bernier, Tomás Carrión, Fidel Vélez, Juan Nazario, and the Cuban brothers Manuel and José Budet Rivera, as well as numerous conspirators from neighboring towns. This uprising was a component of a broader scheme directed by Ramón Emeterio Betances, organized by Menéndez Martínez, and commanded by the Puerto Rican general Juan Ríus Rivera.

The expedition was scheduled for early December. In accordance with the plan, Antonio Mattei Lluberas (leveraging his status as a wealthy sugarcane plantation owner) managed to procure some 30,000 machetes from Germany, which were to be distributed among the revolutionaries. Meanwhile, the Budet Rivera brothers established a training camp on Guillermo Velázco’s plantation, located in the Susúa Alta neighborhood of Yauco. For their part, Gerardo Forrest Vélez and the Dominican Agustín Morales carried out a propaganda campaign across the island to garner support. As part of the overall plan, they secured the backing of the Cuban revolutionary Tomás Estrada Palma, who pledged financial aid, as well as 500 rifles and 500,000 cartridges. Another collaborator, Francisco Javier Cisneros, offered a steamship to transport an invasion force of 200 men, along with the necessary supplies, under the command of General Agustín Morales.

Unfortunately for the aforementioned revolutionaries, the plan was exposed due to the indiscretion of one of the participants, eventually reaching the ears of the Governor General of Puerto Rico via the mayor of Yauco. Upon learning of the disclosure, Fidel Vélez decided to move up the date of the uprising without consulting or coordinating his actions with the other ringleaders. Several of those involved spoke out against this decision, but their arguments failed to persuade Vélez or his followers.

Around ten o'clock on the night of March 24, 1897, a group of between 60 and 80 men, reportedly led by José Maldonado and Fidel Vélez, set off from their camp in Susúa Alta toward the town of Yauco. But not before hoisting the Puerto Rican flag on a pole high above the encampment and taking a photograph of the moment. In the insurrection against Spanish rule which became known as the Intentona de Yauco (Yauco Revolt of 1897), the rebels planned to attack the barracks of the Spanish Civil Guard with the aim of gaining control of the arms and ammunition that were stored there.

The plan did not succeed because when the rebels arrived they were ambushed by the Spanish forces who had set up positions and were waiting for them. A firefight ensued upon the arrival of the group and the rebels quickly retreated. On March 26, another group headed by José Nicolás Quiñones Torres and Ramón Torres attempted to fight the Spaniards in Quebradas. That last revolt, and the last against Spanish rule in Puerto Rico, also failed. Over 150 rebels were arrested, accused of various crimes against the state and sent to prison in the City of Ponce.

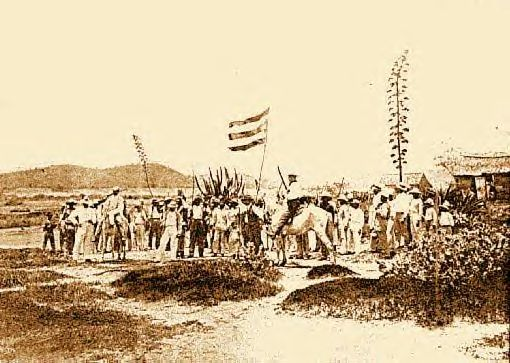
Photo of the Puerto Rican flag flown by Fidel Vélez and Maldonado during the "Intentona de Yauco" revolt and in 1905 published in "Our Islands and their people" under the title of "White eagle and his band of Outlaws"

It was a few days later, when Abelardo Moscoso (who had already been the target of an assassination attempt in 1896) was preparing to leave the island, the moment Maldonado approached him and begged to be taken along. The two set sail for New York, where Maldonado presented himself to the Cuban Revolutionary Committee and was subsequently sent to Cuba as part of an expedition.

From there, Maldonado returned to New York wounded, declaring himself an American citizen and waiting for the forces that would attack Puerto Rico, so that he could go back to the island with the expeditions afterwards.

== Spanish-American War ==
Puerto Rico in 1898 was a wild, no-man’s-land, comparable only to the American frontier in the United States. Hunger, unemployment, and destitution were everywhere. Of the population, 61.8% were white, while the remaining 38.2% consisted of people of mixed race or people of color. Compounding this was the relentless scourge of disease: many Puerto Ricans suffered from anemia, tuberculosis, smallpox, dysentery, and malaria, afflictions that also plagued other colonies in the Caribbean’s West Indies.

Only a third of the inhabitants practiced a trade, and of that group, 68% were engaged in agricultural work. For many years, José Maldonado Román worked as a day laborer, as confirmed by his file.

However, the working conditions for those who practiced this trade were precarious. Landowners paid their laborers in copper or cardboard tokens, known as "fichas", which were accepted only at a plantation's own stores. Furthermore, food at these establishments was both expensive and of poor quality. At times, due to a plantation's financial difficulties, workers were dismissed and forced to leave, abandoning everything they owned, while holding tokens that had no real value outside that environment.

And 1898, for worse rather than for better, began with a stifling drought that persisted well into the spring. Farmers were more concerned about this stubborn drought than in the looming conflict. Coffee production suffered, and some day laborers even went so far as to steal a portion of the diminished harvest to consume in their own huts. Meanwhile, the prices of seeds rose significantly.

But Puerto Rican participation in the United States Armed Forces began shortly before the U.S. invasion of July 25, 1898. To assist the invading forces (also known as expeditionary troops), three distinct groups of Puerto Ricans were organized: the Porto Rican Commission, the Porto Rican Scouts, and the Porto Rican Guards.

The first organized group was tasked with serving as an intermediary between the United States Armed Forces and the Puerto Rican population, with the goal of explaining the objectives of the invasion and preventing Puerto Ricans from forming guerrilla units behind American lines. But rather than fulfilling a strictly military function, the Porto Rican Commission played a political and ethical role within the conflict.

The conflict was short-lived: it began with the landing of U.S. troops in July 1898 and concluded on August 13 of that same year. The strategy of the supreme commander, General Nelson A. Miles, involved landing military forces along the southern coast and advancing across the island from various points until reaching San Juan.

One of the justifications General Nelson Miles provided for invading Puerto Rico via Guánica rather than Fajardo was that the proximity to Yauco would facilitate the recruitment of Puerto Rican auxiliary groups. To coordinate these forces, he relied on the assistance of Antonio Mattei Lluberas and Mateo Fajardo.

But once in Puerto Rico, General Miles ordered the formation of a scouting unit known as the "Porto Rican Scouts." This unit was placed under the command of Eduardo Lugo Viñas and consisted of approximately 70 mounted men. The Porto Rican Scouts were attached to the Schwan Brigade and distinguished themselves during the capture of Sabana Grande, a town that was virtually devoid of Spanish troops. The scouts also took part in the capture of San Germán, though during that operation, they were forced to withdraw from the town following the arrival of Spanish reinforcements.

From Guánica, General Guy Vernon Henry sent a memorandum regarding this matter to Adjutant General Gilmore on July 28, 1898. Gilmore was in charge of communications for Miles’s high command. Henry noted that several residents from the mountain communities had traveled down to Yauco that same day to offer their services to the United States Army as soldiers or guides. In exchange, the army would provide them with rations. Henry accepted the proposal to send a group of these mounted volunteers, accompanied by a few soldiers, to recover several Mauser rifles stored about 16 miles from the town.

Whether or not authorized by the U.S. Army, groups of armed men on horseback harassed Spanish forces and assisted General Miles’s troops until the day of the armistice.

After the Spanish–American War, Puerto Rico was annexed by the United States under the terms of the Treaty of Paris of 1898, ratified on December 10, 1898. This conflict had lasted nineteen days, and it was ostensibly presented as a new model of a more civilized, modern, and humanitarian type of war being carried out to perfection.

The following historical episode is considered the first period of colonial violence in Puerto Rico, also dubbed "the war after the war." During this phase, groups of raiders, thieves, and arsonists, who would smear their faces with charcoal dust, organized in the island’s mountainous interior to target plantation owners. They inflicted economic damage and, in some instances, resorted to violence as a form of vengeance against the landowners. These bands of outlaws did not operate under a centralized leadership, and their actions were largely sporadic. Known as "Los Tiznaos" (the blackened ones), they directed their attacks against peninsular (Spanish-born) plantation owners, pro-annexation "criollos" (local-born elites), and even North American troops in some instances. Most of the rebels were day laborers; they were poorly armed, lacked formal military training, and had no recognized political affiliation.

However, with the invasion a provisional military government was established. Faced with this, American and Spanish authorities joined forces to put an end to outlawry until the year 1899. The "Porto Rican Guards" unit played a notable role in these efforts; because it was composed of Puerto Ricans, it was able to carry out security and law-enforcement duties without drawing undue attention from either side. From that point on, these bands began to gradually disintegrate, as they became the target of a more rigorous and fierce pursuit than that which had been carried out by the Spanish Crown, a situation that eventually led to the capture and execution of many of their members for the crimes they had committed.

Many Puerto Ricans believed that Puerto Rico would gain its independence after having being invaded however, almost immediately, the United States began the "Americanization" process of Puerto Rico. The U.S. occupation brought about a total change in Puerto Rico's economy and polity and did not apply democratic principles to the colony. Puerto Rico was classified as an "unincorporated territory" which meant that the protections of the United States Constitution did not automatically apply because the island belonged to the U.S., but was not part of the U.S. In 1899, the New York Times published a description of Puerto Ricans as "uneducated, simple-minded and harmless people who were only interested in wine, women, music and dancing" and recommended that Spanish should be abolished in the island's schools and only English should be taught. Schools became the primary vehicle of Americanization, and initially all classes were taught in English, which also made for a large dropout rate.

While he remained out of the public eye in Puerto Rico for several months in 1898, José Maldonado made an appearance at the session held on August 2 (following the invasion) to dissolve the Puerto Rico Section of the Cuban Revolutionary Committee. The reason for the dissolution of the Puerto Rico Section was that, according to its leaders and members, the removal of Spanish rule from the island (achieved through the intervention of the U.S.) meant that the party had already fulfilled its purpose and reason for existing.

The party disbanded and Maldonado finally returned to his home country, purportedly with the intention of living a quiet life alongside his mother and siblings, and by working honestly to be of use to society (as he was only 24 years old at the time). However, a malicious gossip put him at odds with the American authorities, and he soon found himself a hunted man once again. Faced with this issue, Maldonado retreated into the wilderness with an armed gang, determined to punish the Spaniards, but he took enough care to spare the American soldiers overseeing the territory.

Upon his return from New York, Águila Blanca organized a gang, composed of other known convicts, with the express purpose of pillaging commercial establishments and plantations belonging to Spaniards from the peninsula. His group was one of many that remained active until the end of the year 1898.

The earliest mention, within the U.S. military documents consulted, of an individual who might have been Águila Blanca committing any form of revolt dates to August 16, 1898. On that date, Major General Guy V. Henry (then stationed in Utuado) informed Adjutant General Gilmore of the presence of a band of outlaws that had been spotted in Jayuya. In response, a cavalry troop was dispatched to investigate the situation. Later, in another telegram, Henry added that the group’s leader (whom he identified simply as "the Eagle") had managed to get ahead of the others to warn them of the cavalry’s arrival.

Even so, Maldonado felt like "holding back", hoping to receive a pardon, as he maintained that he had committed no crime. Yet, he also warned that if no such pardon was granted, he would not be held responsible for the consequences.

But the next time military records mention a "White Eagle" is on December 18, 1898. The telegraph operator in Juana Díaz, whose surname was Bell, informed headquarters in San Juan that "White Eagle and his band of 17 outlaws were seen in the town on the 17th." This group was held responsible for the burning of a plantation belonging to a local landowner named Félix Ansotegui, which was located just a mile west of the spot where they had been seen the day before.

On the 19th, a Colonel Burke reported on his efforts to capture the known bandits, although Águila Blanca was supposedly seen near San Juan. Everything suggests that the army was searching for both the outlaws and Águila Blanca, but separately and for different reasons.

On December 26, 1898, Maldonado wrote a letter to Eugenio Deschamps, the editor of the newspaper Correo de Puerto Rico, requesting that he be pardoned and in which he explained his situation and why he acted against the authorities in his youth. José Maldonado claimed to have nearly killed two men during his lifetime in said biographical letter. He never identified when these incidents occurred. As a result, it remains unclear whether they are connected to the two convictions for attempted murder that appear in his criminal record. But according to Maldonado, his problems with the Spanish police stemmed from his refusal to become a spy, an informant, and a hired killer.

A few days later, Maldonado rode into Ponce and, through Eugenio Deschamps, submitted a request for a pardon to Officer Cassatt (an aide to the U.S. military commander of Ponce). Ultimately, the pardon was granted in January; General Henry authorized it, and it was signed on the 4th by one Lieutenant Colonel Burtle, commander of the Ponce district.

The following summer, José Maldonado Román would produce a legal permit to carry weapons on the island, signed by General Guy Henry himself.

There could have been many reasons for this decision: ranging from the military government’s desire to put an end to the bands of outlaws roaming amok on the island, to the possibility that Maldonado’s testimony proved convincing. It might also have been a politically motivated pardon (given that his raids were directed against the Spanish) or perhaps Maldonado had not, in fact, participated in any revolt against the United States government.

The United States considered anyone who opposed its rule and authority on the island to be anti-American and, as such, initially labeled Maldonado a bandit. In 1905, the editor of Our Islands and Their People, a U.S.-based publication, published a photograph taken during the Intentona de Yauco of 1897, depicting Fidel Vélez and Maldonado unfurling the Puerto Rican flag. The photograph appeared under the title "White Eagle and His Band of Outlaws."

== Trials ==
One of the conditions of the pardon granted by General Henry, which José Maldonado had willingly accepted, was that he serve as an informant for the military authorities in Ponce between January and May of 1899, with the aim of drastically reducing criminal activity in the southern region through his assistance.

The lawyers of both Eugenio Deschamps and Abelardo Moscoso quickly initiated a legal process that brought to public attention the fact that there were unknown individuals in the city paying criminals to commit (or attempt to commit, in some cases) certain murders, of certain politically powerful people in and out of the island.

On May 16, 1899, Maldonado was standing in line for a smallpox vaccination at the Baños de Coamo, in Coamo. He allegedly insisted on cutting the line in order to be attended first. Things spiraled out of control when Maldonado went so far as to threaten the lives of the American doctors in charge of the vaccination process. He was later arrested by the Municipal Guards at his home in the City of Ponce for causing a public disturbance. His gang of men tried in vain to liberate him and the incident erupted into a shootout on the street. During this botched rescuing attempt, Maldonado ended up losing an eye when he got shot at by a police officer who was trying to capture him.

Maldonado had to be admitted into a hospital in San Juan until his health improved significantly and he was physically fit to testify the following month. That day two of his men died from gunshot wounds, one more remained heavily wounded for a couple of months.

In June, Maldonado testified in court against José Pamblanco, who was accused of attempting to target journalist Eugenio Deschamps in April of 1898, acting on instructions from the then president of the Dominican Republic, Ulises Heureaux. Maldonado claimed that Pamblanco had come to him with the proposition of murdering Deschamps and Abelardo Moscoso, along with other individuals listed in a document that had already been made public the previous December. Regarding the actual attempt against Deschamps, he stated that he learned of it just after arriving from New York, and that he began looking into the matter at that point.

On June 8, the judge presiding over the case involving the attempted murder of Deschamps upheld the sentence of eight years and one day of imprisonment against Pamblanco, as per his final ruling. The following day, the same judge ruled that the aggravating circumstance of "alevosía" (treachery or ambush) should be removed from the charges, hence reclassifying the entire case as one for attempted homicide. Therefore, Serapio Acosta (the individual whom was actually tasked with carrying out the murder) was found to be the perpetrator, while Pamblanco was acquitted, as no specific charges could be substantiated against him.

But once he was returned to the hospital following the aftermath of these hearings, Maldonado gave an interview to Evaristo Izcoa Díaz, a local newspaper reporter and editor. In said interview, he expressed a notable lack of trust in Puerto Rican judges, stating that he would prefer the involvement of a special American judge brought in directly from the United States in Deschamps's procedure. He further claimed to have knowledge of details in connection to several other crimes committed in the City of Ponce, such as the case of Adolfo Sánchez Cotorruelo, whose slaying had occurred in 1893. He finished the interview by referring to these types of criminals as being nothing more than "frock-coated bandits."

Around September, Maldonado requested permission from the Court of Justice to travel to San Juan and there speak with the newly appointed governor, George Whitefield Davis, having just discovered that his pardon was not contingent on crimes committed after the fact, likely due to his own involvement in the shootout which had occurred in May. Once he obtained the permission, he boarded a steamship and then set off for the Dominican Republic.

On October 19, 1899, the newspaper La Democracia published the following article:

This well-known figure from the criminal underworld of Ponce is currently in the Dominican Republic, granting interviews to a press that has no qualms about publishing them, as if he were actually a character of some significance. The truth is that El Águila (The Eagle) poses as a political victim, when in reality he is nothing more than a common bandit; he also styles himself a revolutionary leader, when he was, in fact, merely the ringleader of incendiary gangs. There's no doubt El Águila read the article in El Terruño in which it was declared that everyone who took part in those gangs were to be "political" figures...

By the end of October, Maldonado had already been arrested at the lodging establishment he was staying. The arrest arose from a fight he allegedly started at a betting parlor the night prior. He was then sent back from the Dominican Republic to Puerto Rico before the month of November had even begun.

== Prison life ==
In April of 1900, the island's authorities had begun convicting Maldonado for the crimes related to the shootout and the failed rescue attempt that took place in Ponce in May of 1899. However, during the proceedings, a public official asserted that Maldonado ought to serve the sentences imposed upon him by the Spanish regime, which he had managed to evade by departing for New York and Cuba in 1897. It was then that Captain Cassatt (who had served as the intermediary for Maldonado’s pardon in January of 1899) intervened to reiterate that General Henry had already pardoned him for his previous offenses and that Maldonado had agreed to cooperate with the military authorities in return. This intervention prevented the court from adding the years Maldonado had failed to serve (due to his escape from the island) to the final sentencing.

The following month, Maldonado again demanded to be tried by a U.S. court, as he considered himself an American citizen at the time. But he was not granted another trial, nor his demands were taken into consideration. During this brief stretch in prison, Maldonado’s behavior earned him praise from the prison officials, and in March of 1903, he was promoted to the rank of corporal.

For the twelve years that followed, Maldonado undertook work as a government employee while in prison, primarily building streets and roads in rural areas.

After completing this sentence, Maldonado was convicted of extortion in San Juan in 1907. He was released in 1909, and shortly after leaving prison, he then decided to partake in a break-in of the Isleños plantation, which used to be located on the road between Cayey and Guayama. Maldonado was sent back to prison on a charge of first-degree burglary. During this sentence, he attempted to escape and also demonstrated, in various ways, his resistance to the penal system.

More years went by, and José Maldonado was finally released in 1915 and never set foot inside a prison cell again. Right after completing this sentence, Maldonado requested that the acting prison officials listed Ponce as his current place of residence, rather than San Juan (which it had been for years), on his inmate record before departing.

== Death ==
At some point between the years of 1907 and 1909, Maldonado started a family late in life, after years of imprisonment. He married a woman named Juana Estrada, Margarita Maldonado Colón's grandmother.

During his final years, living again in San Juan, Maldonado was visited many times by the then president of the Puerto Rican Nationalist Party, Pedro Albizu Campos. Other influential figures, such as journalists, also visited him. As 1931 began, Maldonado started suffering from an illness. He became a patient at the San Juan Presbyterian Hospital in June. An American doctor, whom people called "the German," used to inject him with medications. A few months later, he developed cancer. According to official documentation provided by relatives, José Maldonado passed away on January 17, 1932, due to a throat cancer while resting at his home in the Candelaria neighborhood of Toa Baja, San Juan. Upon his death, he left his family with nothing but poverty as their sole inheritance.

== Folk-hero ==
José Maldonado was, allegedly, one-eyed and one-armed, like a pirate. He would set sugarcane fields ablaze whenever landowners refused his demands. He would distribute the spoils of his illicit activities among the poor. He was compassionate toward those in need, yet implacable toward those who abused others. It was said that he was a magician (that he possessed books of magic) and that this was how he managed to escape from prison the very night he was locked up. He was a guerrilla fighter who reportedly engaged in a shootout with U.S. troops at Guánica in 1898. There was a time when Puerto Rico respected and admired him for what he had done in life.

Maldonado dressed well: linen trousers and jacket, a pocket watch on a chain, a Panama hat, and his ever-present revolver always within reach.

His acts of banditry were considered criminal by the authorities, but in turn he gained the admiration of the common jíbaro (humble farmer) who viewed his acts as rebellion against the rich and powerful, and against the Spanish Crown which they considered oppressive. The poor in the neighborhood received bread from his hands. Loaves of bread that he would distribute throughout the area. He also provided money and medicine to those in need. He would visit the homes of the wealthy landowners living in Toa Baja at the time, presenting them with a written request for funds to help those needing help.

One of the many stories about one of Águila Blanca’s escapes through the mountains recounts how an elderly couple gave him shelter in their home, warning him to be careful because the Civil Guard had informed them that a dangerous fugitive was in the area. The next day, he said his goodbyes to them very early in the morning but then handed them a note, instructing them to deliver it to a certain landowner, who would reward them for the good will they had shown him. He revealed to them that he was, in fact, the fugitive, and that he was far less dangerous than those who were spreading such reports about him. (Note: A similar scene to the one described by Margarita Maldonado Colón in her oral essay about José Maldonado plays out in Henry King's 1950 film The Gunfighter. As in the episode told in the essay, Johnny Ringo, who is wanted by the law for killing a man, encounters a group of elderly women making judgmental and hurtful remarks about him in his presence, unaware of his true identity. Ringo engages them in a conversation about himself and attempts to convince them that the fugitive they have judged so harshly might not be such a bad person after all. Before the scene ends, he reveals that he is Johnny Ringo, much to the women's disbelief and anger.)

This is the version of the story of "El Águila Blanca" (The White Eagle), as it exists in oral tradition, which is known to many in Puerto Rico. As is often the case with figures of this kind, oral tradition has retained only vague traces of his life and has idealized the rest of Maldonado's actions. Up to date, there is no single document that supports the entirety of these events, but there are accounts that may corroborate the existing documentation.

== Historical controversies ==
In his book War Against All Puerto Ricans, writer Nelson Denis states that this "Robin Hood-esque" mythos surrounding Águila Blanca made the real José Maldonado a figure of great renown within certain nationalist and pro-independence circles in Puerto Rico. He also maintains that, prior to the 1898 invasion, many of the accusations against him were related to the theft of livestock, which, according to popular tradition, benefited poor peasants and day laborers. According to various sources cited in the book, Maldonado established a barbershop called Salón Boricua, located at 351 Colton Street, at the corner of Barbosa Avenue, in Barrio Obrero (San Juan). Among his employees was Vidal Santiago Díaz who, in 1932, purchased the barbershop from Maldonado. Santiago Díaz was the barber of Albizu Campos and played a part in the Nationalist Revolts of 1950.

The name was hardly a coincidence: it represented an assertion of identity at a time when the new American colonial regime sought to redefine what it meant to be Puerto Rican. This word, Boricua, is synonymous with Puerto Rican ancestry and is a self-referential term which Puerto Ricans commonly employ. The word is derived from the word Borinquen (Borinquen, in turn, is the Hispanicized adaptation of Borikén, the name which the native Taínos gave to the island before the arrival of the Spanish Conquistadors).

Some accounts maintain that Maldonado continued to assist pro-independence supporters discreetly, and that his barbershop served as a meeting point for the exchange of information, logistical support, provisions, and weapons. It has even been claimed in the book that he helped establish links between Albizu Campos and some of the most committed pro-independence figures on the island. Nevertheless, the exact extent of these activities remains a subject of debate among historians and researchers.

Regarding his final years, Nelson Denis asserts that José Maldonado Román initially received treatment for a throat cancer illness at the Presbyterian Hospital in San Juan and later died inside his barbershop at the age of 58. However, these claims have been challenged by Maldonado's descendants, who point to discrepancies between Denis’s account and the available documentation concerning the death of Águila Blanca.

== Legacy ==
Puerto Rican ballad singer Roy Brown wrote and dedicated to Maldonado a song titled "Águila Blanca." Ángel Pacheco Alvarado, a folk singer from Peñuelas, Puerto Rico honored Maldonado's memory with a song composed of three verses of which the first one is the following:

Spanish (original version)	English translation
Era José Maldonado o Pepe, "El Águila Blanca" hombre de palabra franca y de espíritu elevado Muchas veces fue acusado Por la insensata opinión De bandolero y ladrón Porque con limpia hidalguía Los abusos combatía De la hispánica opresión.	He was José Maldonado or Pepe, "The White Eagle" man of clear word and of high spirit. Many times was he accused By the senseless opinion Of bandit and thief Because with clean nobility He fought the abuses Of the Hispanic oppression

Puerto Rican author and poet Reynaldo Marcos Padua published his third novel, titled Águila (Eagle), in 2008. The book is an epic work of historical fiction loosely based on the life of José Maldonado Román. Closely following the narrative presented in Maldonado's own autobiographical letter, published in a newspaper, Padua's novel, with its historical and biographical backdrop, straddles the line between fiction and non-fiction. "In it, he stated his age, twenty-something years," Padua said regarding the letter. "He claimed to be fluent in English and to have a plan ready, and he threatened to set it in motion against the Americans unless a number of charges the Spanish authorities held against him were dropped. That letter served as the catalyst for the use of my imagination, creating and inventing where there was nothing." It also fictionalizes the real-life historical figures of Eugenio Deschamps and Abelardo Moscoso. The story reconstructs the circumstances and motivations behind many of Águila Blanca's actions before, throughout and after the Spanish-American War.

== See also ==
- List of Puerto Ricans
- Intentona de Yauco
- Puerto Rican Campaign
