= La Borinqueña =

National anthem of Puerto Rico

English: "The Borinquen"
- Regional anthem of Puerto Rico
- Lyrics: Manuel Fernández Juncos, 1901
- Music: Félix Astol Artés, 1867 (Note: Or possibly Francisco Ramírez.) (original version); Luis Miranda, 1922 (current version)
- Adopted: 1952 (as instrumental)
- Readopted: July 27, 1977 (with lyrics)

Audio sample
- U.S. Navy Band-performed instrumental version in G minor: file; help

"La Borinqueña" (Note: The title of the song is derived from a name for a female Puerto Rican, in turn originateing from Bori(n)quén (Spanish: [boɾi(ŋ)ˈken]), an alternative name for Puerto Rico which is itself of native, Taíno, origin.) (Note: IPA: [la βoɾiŋˈkeɲa]) is the regional anthem of Puerto Rico.After Puerto Rico became known as "The Commonwealth of Puerto Rico" in 1952, the first elected governor, Luis Muñoz Marín, signed law #2 of July 24, 1952, which made an altered version of the musical composition known as "La Borinqueña" its regional anthem. The words that go with the composition were approved by governor Carlos Romero Barceló on July 27, 1977, as per law #123.

== Etymology ==
The title refers to the aboriginal Taíno name for the island of Puerto Rico, Borinquén.

== History ==
Original instrumental version
The original quicker-tempo 19th-century arrangement of "La Borinqueña", as performed by the United States Navy Band.

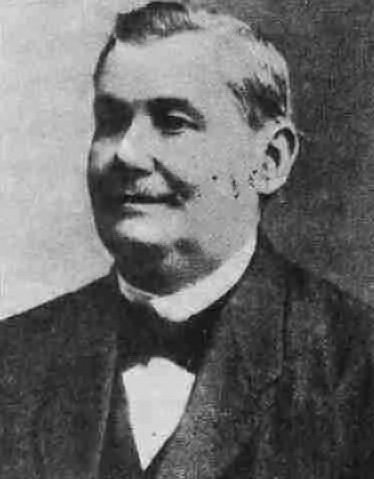
Manuel Fernandez Juncos, author of the current officially adopted lyrics of "La Borinqueña"

The music was originally credited to Félix Astol Artés in 1867 as a habanera danza, with romantic lyrics, but there is some evidence that Francisco Ramírez, a native of San Germán, wrote the music in 1860, and named it "La Almojábana". In 1868, Lola Rodríguez de Tió wrote a poem in support of the Puerto Rican revolution, which was set to the Ramírez/Astol music. In fear of investigation by the Spanish government, Ramírez asked Astol to claim authorship of the music since he was a native of Catalonia and would, therefore, raise no suspicion.

After the cession of the island to the United States, the popular revolutionary lyrics of Lola Rodríguez de Tió were deemed too subversive for official adoption; therefore, a non-confrontational set of lyrics were written in 1903 by Asturias-born Manuel Fernández Juncos. The tune was officially adopted as Puerto Rico's regional anthem in 1952 by governor Luis Muñoz Marín, and the words were adopted in 1977 by governor Carlos Romero Barceló.

The version of "La Borinqueña" that is most commonly performed today is performed as a slow-tempo march, without the original tune's initial paseo. Per the request of the new government, Ramón Collado rearranged the music in 1952 into a more military-like tune. Luis Miranda, the musical director of Puerto Rico's 65th Infantry Regiment Band, adapted the tune to be played as a march in 1922. The 1977 law that officially adopted the words merely stated that "La Borinqueña" be played as a march, with the tempo vaguely described as being in a "martial manner", but established no official arrangement for the music. An official revision made in 2003 leaves the tune as a march.

In 2012, Dr. Yajaira Sierra Sastre, an aspiring astronaut, collaborated in a variety of projects with the National Nanotechnology Infrastructure Network and the Cornell Nanoscale Facility, which included writing the smallest "national" anthem ever written, "La Borinqueña Más Pequeña".

According to Puerto Rico Law # 2 of July 24, 1952, both "La Borinqueña" and "The Star-Spangled Banner" are played at official events. During international sports competitions such as the Olympics, only "La Borinqueña" is played.

The anthem, with its revolutionary lyrics, was featured in Steven Spielberg's 2021 film adaptation of the stage musical West Side Story, sung by the Puerto Rican gang, the Sharks, early in the film. It was never used in the stage version nor its 1961 film adaptation prior to this film.

== Lyrics ==
=== Current lyrics ===
The following are the current lyrics, as written by Manuel Fernández Juncos and adopted in 1903.

Spanish original

La tierra de Borinquén
donde he nacido yo
es un jardín florido
de mágico primor.

Un cielo siempre nítido
le sirve de dosel
y dan arrullos plácidos
las olas a sus pies.

Cuando a sus playas llegó Colón
(𝄆) exclamó, lleno de admiración: (𝄇)
¡Oh!, ¡oh!, ¡oh!,

Esta es la linda tierra
que busco yo;
Es Borinquén la hija,
la hija del mar y el sol,
𝄆 Del mar y el sol,
del mar y el sol. 𝄇

IPA transcription (Note: See Help:IPA/Spanish, Spanish phonology and Puerto Rican Spanish.)

[la ˈtje.ra ðe βo.ɾiŋ.ˈken]
[ˈdon.de‿e na.ˈsi.ðo ʝo]
[es un xaɾ.ˈðin flo.ˈɾi.ðo]
[de ˈma.xi.ko pɾi.ˈmoɾ]

[un ˈsje.lo ˈsjem.pɾe ˈni.ti.ðo]
[le ˈsiɾ.βe ðe ðo.ˈsel]
[i ðan a.ˈru.ʝos ˈpla.si.ðos]
[las ˈo.las a sus pjes]

[ˈkwan.do‿a sus ˈpla.ʝas ʝe.ˈɣo ko.ˈlon]
(𝄆) [eɣs.kla.ˈmo ˈʝe.no ðe‿að.mi.ɾa.ˈsjon] (𝄇)
[o ǀ o ǀ o ǁ]

[ˈes.ta‿ez la ˈlin.da ˈtje.ra]
[ke ˈβus.ko ʝo]
[ez βo.ɾiŋ.ˈken la ˈi.xa]
[la ˈi.xa ðel maɾ i‿el sol]
𝄆 [ðel maɾ i‿el sol]
[ðel maɾ i‿el sol] 𝄇

English translation

The land of Borinquén
where I was born
is a flowery garden
of magical neatness.

An always-clear sky
serves as its canopy.
And placid cooings are made
by the waves at its feet.

When at her beaches Columbus arrived;
(𝄆) he exclaimed full of admiration (𝄇)
Oh! Oh! Oh!

This is the pretty land
that I seek.
Borinquén is the daughter,
the daughter of the sea and the sun.
𝄆 Of the sea and the sun,
of the sea and the sun. 𝄇

=== Original 1868 revolutionary lyrics ===
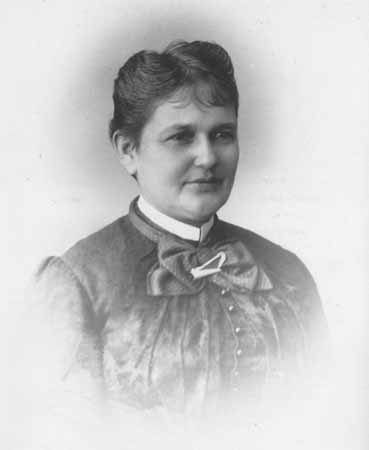
Lola Rodríguez de Tió, author of the original lyrics

Spanish original

I
¡Despierta, borinqueño
que han dado la señal!
¡Despierta de ese sueño
que es hora de luchar!

A ese llamar patriótico
¿no arde tu corazón?
¡Ven! Nos será simpático
el ruido del cañón.

Mira, ya el cubano
libre será;
𝄆 le dará el machete
su libertad. 𝄇

Ya el tambor guerrero
dice en su son,
que es la manigua el sitio,
el sitio de la reunión,
𝄆 de la reunión,
de la reunión. 𝄇

(El Grito de Lares
se ha de repetir,
y entonces sabremos
vencer o morir.)

II
Bellísima Borinquén,
a Cuba hay que seguir;
tú tienes bravos hijos
que quieren combatir.

ya por más tiempo impávido
no podemos estar,
ya no queremos, tímidos
dejarnos subyugar.

Nosotros queremos
ser libre ya,
𝄆 y nuestro machete
afilado está. 𝄇

¿Por qué, entonces, nosotros
hemos de estar,
tan dormidos y sordos
y sordos a esa señal?
𝄆 a esa señal,
a esa señal? 𝄇

III
No hay que temer, riqueños
al ruido del cañón,
que salvar a la patria
es deber del corazón!

ya no queremos déspotas,
caiga el tirano ya,
las mujeres indómitas
también sabrán luchar.

Nosotros queremos
la libertad,
𝄆 y nuestro machete
nos la dará. 𝄇

Vámonos, borinqueños,
vámonos ya,
que nos espera ansiosa,
ansiosa la libertad.
𝄆 ¡La libertad,
la libertad! 𝄇

English translation

I
Arise, boricua!
The call to arms has sounded!
Awake from the slumber,
it is time to fight!

Doesn't this patriotic
call set your heart alight?
Come! We are in tune with
the roar of the cannon.

Come, Come, the Cuban will
soon be freed;
𝄆 the machete will give him
his liberty. 𝄇

Now the drums of war
speak with their music,
that the jungle is the place,
the meeting place.
𝄆 The meeting,
The meeting. 𝄇

(The Cry of Lares
must be repeated,
and then we will know:
victory or death.)

II
Beautiful Borinquén
must follow Cuba;
you have brave sons
who wish to fight.

Now, no longer can
we be unmoved;
now we do not want timidly
to let them subjugate us.

We want
to be free now,
𝄆 and our machete
has been sharpened. 𝄇

Why, then,
have we been
so sleepy and deaf
and deaf to the call?
𝄆 To the call,
to the call? 𝄇

III
There is no need to fear,
Ricans, the roar of the cannon;
saving the nation is
the duty of the heart.

We no longer want despots,
tyranny shall fall now;
the unconquerable women also will
know how to fight.

We want
freedom,
𝄆 and our machete
will give it to us. 𝄇

Come, Boricuas,
come now,
since awaiting us eagerly,
eagerly, is freedom,
𝄆 freedom,
freedom! 𝄇

==== Abridged version ====
A short version of the revolutionary lyrics is sometimes sung, consisting of the first half of the first verse and the second half of the third verse.

Spanish original

I
¡Despierta, borinqueño
que han dado la señal!
¡Despierta de ese sueño
que es hora de luchar!

A ese llamar patriótico
¿no arde tu corazón?
¡Ven! Nos será simpático
el ruido del cañón.

III
Nosotros queremos
la libertad,
y nuestro machete
nos la dará.

Vámonos, borinqueños,
vámonos ya,
que nos espera ansiosa,
ansiosa la libertad.
𝄆 ¡La libertad,
la libertad! 𝄇

English translation

I
Arise, boricua!
The call to arms has sounded!
Awake from the slumber,
it is time to fight!

Doesn't this patriotic
call set your heart alight?
Come! We are in tune with
the roar of the cannon.

III
We want
freedom,
and our machete
will give it to us.

Come, Boricuas,
come now,
since awaiting us eagerly,
eagerly, is freedom
𝄆 freedom,
freedom! 𝄇
