= List of Puerto Rican flags =

Official flag of the U.S. territory of Puerto Rico

Puerto Rico
- The Monostarred; La Monoestrellada (Spanish)
- Current Flag of Puerto Rico (1995); Medium Blue; Azul Medio (Spanish)
- Use: Civil and state flag, civil and state ensign
- Proportion: 2:3
- Adopted: August 3, 1995; 31 years ago by elected Puerto Rican government after issuing regulation identifying colors but not specifying color shades; medium blue replaced dark blue as de facto shade of triangle
- Flag of Puerto Rico (1952); Dark Blue; Azul Oscuro (Spanish)
- Use: Civil and state flag, civil and state ensign
- Proportion: 2:3
- Adopted: July 24, 1952; 74 years ago by elected Puerto Rican government with the establishment of the commonwealth after issuing law identifying colors but not specifying color shades; dark blue became de facto shade of triangle, replacing presumed original light blue
- Flag of Puerto Rico (1895); Light Blue; Azul Claro (Spanish)
- Use: Civil and state flag, civil and state ensign
- Proportion: 2:3
- Adopted: December 22, 1895; 130 years ago by pro-independence members of the Revolutionary Committee of Puerto Rico exiled in New York City; members identified colors as red, white, and blue but did not specify color shades; some historians have presumed members adopted light blue shade based on the light blue flag of the Grito de Lares revolt
- Design: Five equal horizontal stripes, alternating from red to white, with a blue equilateral triangle based on the hoist side bearing a large, white, upright five-pointed star in the center
- Designed by: Disputed between Puerto Ricans Francisco Gonzalo Marín in 1895 and Antonio Vélez Alvarado in 1892; Based on Cuban flag by Venezuelan Narciso López and Cuban Miguel Teurbe Tolón in 1849

This is a list of the flags of Puerto Rico. These flags represent and symbolize Puerto Rico and the Puerto Rican people. The most commonly used flags of Puerto Rico are the current flag, which represents the people of the commonwealth of Puerto Rico; the Grito de Lares flag, which represents the Grito of Lares (Cry of Lares) revolt against Spanish rule in 1868; municipal flags, which represent the 78 municipalities of the archipelago; political flags, which represent the different political beliefs of the people; and sports flags, which identify Puerto Rico as the country represented by its athletics during competitions.

Each of the 78 municipalities of Puerto Rico has adopted flags which represent the municipality and its people, employing designs that oftentimes derive their symbolism from the municipality's coat of arms. Most of the political parties in Puerto Rico also have their own flags, which represent and symbolize the political ideals of its members. These political party flags are usually displayed in public during political rallies, meetings, or parades in a show of political strength and unity. Various sports associations in Puerto Rico have adopted flags which represent them and which are used during competitions and other sport events.

== First flags used ==
Captain's ensign of Columbus's ships

The introduction of a flag in Puerto Rico can be traced to when Christopher Columbus landed on the island's shore and with the flag appointed to him by the Spanish Crown claimed the island, which he named San Juan Bautista, in the name of Spain. Columbus wrote in his logbook that on October 12, 1492, he used the royal flag, and that his captains used two flags which the admiral carried in all the ships as ensign, each white with a green cross in the middle and an 'F' and 'Y', both green and crowned with golden, open royal crowns, for Ferdinand II of Aragon and Ysabel (Isabel I). The conquistadores under the command of Juan Ponce de León proceeded to conquer and settle the island. They carried as their military standard the Spanish Expedition Flag. After the island was conquered and colonized, the flag of Spain was used in Puerto Rico, same as it was used in all of its other colonies.

Once the Spanish armed forces established themselves on the island, they began the construction of military fortifications, such as La Fortaleza, Fort San Felipe del Morro, Fort San Cristóbal and San Gerónimo. The Spanish Army designed the Burgundy Cross, adopting it as their standard. This flag flew wherever there was a Spanish military installation.

== First flag designed ==
The independence movement in Puerto Rico gained momentum with the liberation successes of Simón Bolívar and José de San Martín in South America. In 1868, Puerto Rican independence leader Ramón Emeterio Betances urged Mariana Bracetti to knit a revolutionary flag using the flag of the Dominican Republic as an example, promoting the then popular ideal of uniting the three Spanish-speaking Caribbean territories into an Antillean Confederation. The materials for the flag were provided by Eduvigis Beauchamp Sterling, named Treasurer of the revolution by Betances.

The Grito de Lares flag, matching the colors of the current flag of Puerto Rico

The flag is quautered by a white cross, with two lower rectangles in red and the two upper rectangles in blue with, the upper left of which bears a white five-pointed star. According to Puerto Rican poet Luis Lloréns Torres, the white cross on it stands for the yearning for homeland redemption; the red squares, the blood poured by the heroes of the rebellion and the white star in the blue solitude square, stands for liberty and freedom. The revolutionary Lares flag was used in the short-lived rebellion against Spain in what became known as Grito de Lares (The Cry of Lares).

During the revolt, the flag was proclaimed the national flag of the "Republic of Puerto Rico" by Francisco Ramírez Medina, who was sworn in as Puerto Rico's first president, and placed on the high altar of the Catholic Church of Lares, thus becoming the first Puerto Rican flag. One of two surviving original Lares flags was taken by a Spanish army officer as a war prize. Many years later, it was returned and transferred to the Puerto Rican people. It is now exhibited in the University of Puerto Rico's Museum.

In 1873, following the abdication of Amadeus, Duke of Aosta, as king (1870–1873) and with Spain's change from Kingdom to Republic, the Spanish government issued a new colonial flag for Puerto Rico. The new flag, which was used until 1873, resembled the flag of Spain, with the difference that it had the coat of arms of Puerto Rico in the middle. Spain's flag once more flew over Puerto Rico with the restoration of the Spanish kingdom in 1873, until 1898 the year that the island became a possession of the United States under the terms of the Treaty of Paris (1898) in the aftermath of the Spanish–American War.

== Historical flags ==
The following are historical flags related to Puerto Rico:

Historical flags flown in Puerto Rico

Flag of the Kingdom of Castile (1492)

Burgundy Cross Flag (Spanish military flag)

Flag of Spain (1701–1793) in fortresses and castles

First Puerto Rican flag, the original revolutionary flag of the Grito de Lares revolt (1868)

Puerto Rico Provincial Flag (1873–1875)

Flag of Spain (1793–1873, 1875–1898)

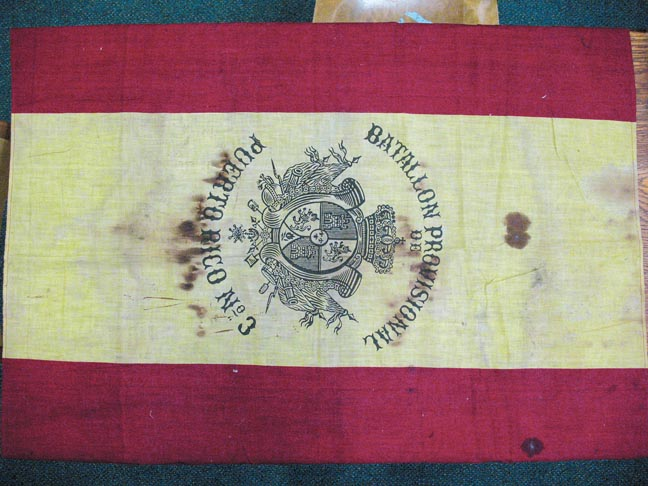
Spanish American War flag Flag of the Batallón Provisional No. 3 de Puerto Rico (3rd Provisional Battalion of Puerto Rico)

Flag of Spain (1873–1874) First Spanish Republic

Puerto Rican flag aboard the Space Shuttle Discovery; March 15, 2009

Historical flags of the United States flown in Puerto Rico (1898–1959) (from 1898 to 1952 the American flag was the only one permitted in Puerto Rico)
45-star American flag, the first U.S. flag flown in Puerto Rico (1898–1908)	46-star American flag (1908–1912)	48-star American flag (1912–1959)	49-star American flag (1959–1960)

== Municipal flags ==
Each of the municipalities of Puerto Rico, including the islands of Culebra and Vieques, have adopted a flag which represents the region and its people. The colors and designs may vary. Some flags contain a coat of arms or images of an object associated with the region, such as a bird, animal, or crop. In the case of Lares, in 1952, the town Municipal Assembly adopted the Grito de Lares flag as their official emblem. The barrios of the municipality of Caguas also have their own flags.

Many of the municipal flags of Puerto Rico pay tribute to the Cacíques of the Taíno people in Puerto Rico, who ruled the island before the arrival of the Spaniards. The flag of Utuado for example has a Taino Sun in honor of the Supreme Taino Cacique Agüeybaná whose name means "The Great Sun". Other flags, such as San Germán's, contain a mural crown. The crown pays tribute to Spain and the Spanish who settled the area.

Flags of the municipalities of Puerto Rico

Adjuntas

Aguada

Aguadilla

Aguas Buenas

Aibonito

Añasco

Arecibo

Arroyo

Barceloneta

Barranquitas

Bayamón

Cabo Rojo

Caguas

Camuy

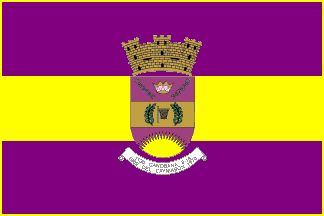
Canóvanas

Cataño

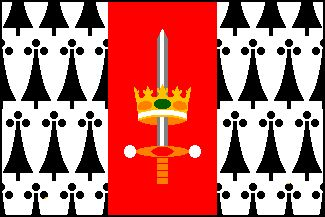
Carolina

Cayey

Ceiba

Ciales

Cidra

Coamo

Comerio

Corozal

Culebra

Dorado

Fajardo

Florida

Guánica

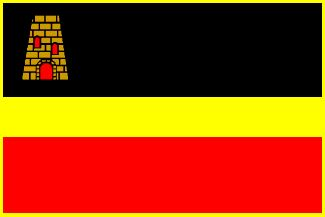
Guayama

Guayanilla

Guaynabo

Gurabo

Hatillo

Hormigueros

Humacao

Isabela

Jayuya

Juana Díaz

Juncos

Lajas

Lares

Las Marias

Las Piedras

Loíza

Luquillo

Manatí

Maricao

Maunabo

Mayagüez

Moca

Morovis

Naguabo

Naranjito

Orocovis

Patillas

Peñuelas

Ponce

Quebradillas

Rincón

Rio Grande

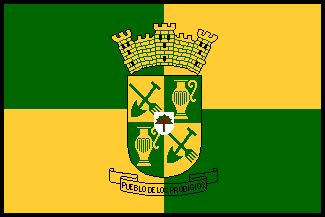
Sabana Grande

Salinas

San Germán

San Juan

San Lorenzo

San Sebastián

Santa Isabel

Toa Alta

Toa Baja

Trujillo Alto

Utuado

Vega Alta

Vega Baja

Vieques

Villalba

Yabucoa

Yauco

== Political flags ==
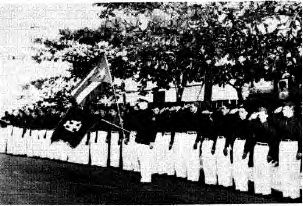
Cadets of the Republic, commanded by Raimundo Díaz Pacheco, with both the Nationalist and Puerto Rican flags

Throughout Puerto Rico's political history various parties have designed and displayed flags representing their ideals. Political flags in Puerto Rico are usually displayed in public during rallies, meetings, or parades in show of political strength and unity. The Puerto Rican Nationalist Party flag has a white Calatrava Cross, also known as the Cross potent on the middle of a black background. The Cross of Calatrava was first used by the Crusaders of Calatrava and later by the French revolutionists. The black background symbolized the mourning of the Puerto Rican Nation in colonial captivity. It was usually displayed by the Cadets of the Republic, also known as the Black Shirts (Camisa Negras) because of their black shirt and white trousers uniform. On occasions the Nationalists would also carry the Puerto Rican flag with the light blue triangle, which was presumably the flag of Puerto Rico between 1898 and 1952.

The three main political parties of Puerto Rico are the New Progressive Party, which favors statehood and whose flag has what might resemble a blue palm tree inside a round cornered square in the middle with a white background; the Popular Democratic Party of Puerto Rico, flag has a red image of what is supposed to resemble a Puerto Rican jíbaro (farmer) in the middle with a white background; and the Puerto Rican Independence Party, whose flag has a white cross symbolizing Christianity and purity, on a green background which symbolizes hope.

Founded in 2003, the flag of the Puerto Ricans for Puerto Rico Party has a light brown colored "coqui" as its symbol with the words Por Puerto Rico (For Puerto Rico) in the middle.

Another political flag is that of the Boricua Popular Army, also known as Los Macheteros, an underground pro-independence group which believes and has often resorted to the use of violence. This ensign displays a green machete and a red star imposed on a black background.

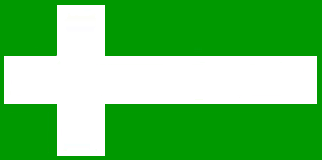
Political Flags of Puerto Rico
Puerto Rican Nationalist Party (Partido Nacionalista Puertorriqueño) founded 1922
Puerto Rican Independence Party (Partido Independentista Puertorriqueño) founded 1946
New Progressive Party of Puerto Rico (Partido Nuevo Progresista de Puerto Rico) founded 1967
Popular Democratic Party of Puerto Rico (Partido Popular Democrático de Puerto Rico) founded 1938

== Sports flags ==
The standard representative symbol carried by Puerto Ricans at international sports events, such as the Olympics, Pan American Games, Central American and Caribbean Games, and the World Cup of Baseball, is the current flag of Puerto Rico. However, various sports associations have adopted flags which are also used during sports events. Prior to the adoption of the Puerto Rican flag, athletes from the archipelago competed under both the United States flag and a special white banner containing a variation of the seal and the words "Puerto Rico" present above it. The symbolism in this ensign includes a green background that represents the main island's vegetation, the Lamb of God symbolizing Jesus of Nazareth, and a book with the seven seals where the lamb sits, in reference to the Book of Revelation.

== See also ==
- Flag of Puerto Rico
- Coat of arms of Puerto Rico
- Seal of Puerto Rico
- Flag of Cuba, a similar flag with the red and blue reversed, and longer length
- Det Stavangerske Dampskibsselskap – A Norwegian shipping company with a virtually identical flag in its logo

== Primary sources ==
- Act No.1, Approved July 24, 1952.
- Regulations on the Use of the Puerto Rico flag. Núm. 5282, August 3, 1995 (in Spanish)
- Mapas, Escudos y Banderas de Puerto Rico (in Spanish) (Actualized ed.). Puerto Rico: Láminas Latino. 2007.
