= Grito de Lares flag =

Flag of 1868 revolt against Spanish rule in Puerto Rico

Grito de Lares Flag Bandera del Grito de Lares (Spanish)
- Current Grito de Lares Flag; Medium Blue; Azul Medio (Spanish)
- Adopted: Composition of the flag based on the current, government-recognized flag of the municipality of Lares, the town that adopted the standard of the Grito de Lares revolt after it took place in its territory
- Current Grito de Lares Flag; Dark Blue; Azul Oscuro (Spanish)
- Adopted: Composition of the flag based on the current flag of the municipality of Lares and the Grito de Lares flag exhibited at the Museum of the Army in Spain since 2022
- Authentic Grito de Lares Flag (1868)
- Adopted: September 23, 1868; 158 years ago by members of the Revolutionary Committee of Puerto Rico; mentioned in 1872 in the chronicle Historia de la insurrección de Lares by José Pérez Moris, its originality is authenticated by a written primary source
- Current Grito de Lares Flag; Light Blue; Azul Claro (Spanish)
- Adopted: Composition of the flag based on the current flag of the municipality of Lares and the Grito de Lares flag exhibited at the Museum of History, Anthropology and Art of the University of Puerto Rico since 1954
- Inauthentic Grito de Lares Flag (1868)
- Adopted: September 23, 1868; 158 years ago by members of the Revolutionary Committee of Puerto Rico; with no written primary sources authenticating it, its originality is disputed, with most historians recognizing it as a copy possibly made by the Nationalist Party of Puerto Rico in the 1930s based on contemporaneous but secondary oral sources
- Design: Consists of a large white Greek cross in the center that extends to all four sides of the flag, dividing it into four equal rectangles, two blue above, the left of which bears a large, sharp, upright, centered, five-pointed white star, and two red below; See specifications in Colors and Dimensions
- Designed by: Ramón Emeterio Betances in 1868; based on the Dominican flag by Juan Pablo Duarte in 1844, and Cuban flag by Venezuelan Narciso López and Cuban Miguel Teurbe Tolón in 1849

The Grito de Lares flag (Spanish: Bandera del Grito de Lares), most commonly known as the Lares flag (Spanish: Bandera de Lares), represents the Grito de Lares (Cry of Lares) revolt of 1868, the first of two short-lived rebellions against Spanish rule in Puerto Rico. It consists of a large white Greek cross in the center that extends to all four sides of the flag, dividing it into four equal rectangles, two blue above, the left of which bears a large, sharp, upright, centered, five-pointed white star, and two red below. The white star stands for liberty and freedom, the red rectangles for the blood poured by the heroes of the revolt, and the white cross for the yearning of homeland redemption. Established in the municipality of Lares 27 years before revolutionaries adopted the current flag of Puerto Rico in New York City, the flag of the revolt is recognized as the first flag of the archipelago and island.

Today, the flag is the official flag of the municipality of Lares, location of the Grito de Lares (Cry of Lares) revolt in 1868. It is also commonly used to show support for Puerto Rican independence from the United States, rejecting other alternatives on the issue of Puerto Rico's political status, namely statehood or integration into the U.S. as a state, and the current intermediary status of commonwealth as an unincorporated and organized U.S. territory. The independence movement of Puerto Rico has adopted light blue as the color of the flag.

== History ==
=== Origins ===
In 1868, Puerto Rican pro-independence leader Ramón Emeterio Betances urged Eduviges Beauchamp Sterling to sew and embroider the revolutionary flag of the Grito de Lares (Cry of Lares), the standard of the first of two short-lived revolts against Spanish rule in the main island, using as design the quartered flag of the First Dominican Republic, which was inspired by the Haitian and French flags, and based on the regimental flags of the Kingdom of France, and the lone star of the Cuban flag of the Grito de Yara (Cry of Yara) revolt at the sugar plantation and mill of La Demajagua in Cuba.

The fusion of the Dominican and Cuban flags to make the Lares flag was aimed at promoting the union of the neighboring Spanish-speaking Greater Antilles—the single-nation islands of Cuba and Puerto Rico, and the Dominican Republic in the two-nation island of Hispaniola—into an Antillean Confederation for the protection and preservation of their sovereignty and interests.

In 1868, after the Grito de Lares (Cry of Lares) revolt, Francisco Ramírez Medina, having been sworn in as the first president of Puerto Rico by the revolutionaries, intended to proclaim the Lares flag as the national flag of the free and independent "Republic of Puerto Rico." Marking the establishment of a national consciousness for the first time in Puerto Rico, it is recognized as the first flag of the archipelago and island.

==== Authentic flag ====
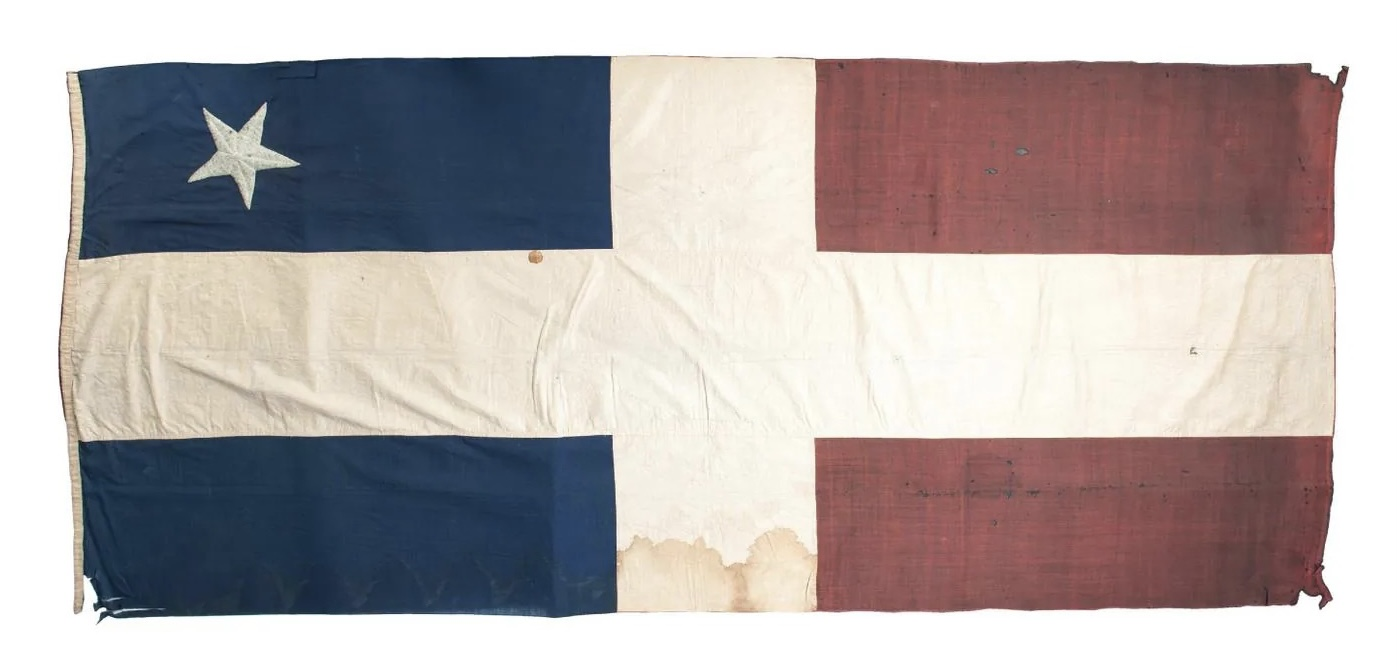
Authenticated original flag of the Grito de Lares (1868)

Only one flag of the Grito de Lares (Cry of Lares) revolt and independent "Republic of Puerto Rico" has been authenticated as original by written primary sources. The flag is quartered by a centered white cross, with two deep red squares on the fly side and two dark blue squares on the hoist side, the top of which bears a tiled, sharp, centered, five-pointed white star.

In 1868, the flag was captured by the Spanish leader in charged of the repression against the revolutionaries, Colonel Manuel Iturriaga, after it was discovered buried in one of two wooden boxes alongside hundreds of cartridges for rifles on the coffee farm of a rebel named José Antonio Hernández in the Piedra Gorda barrio (then known as Palomar) of Camuy, a town immediately to north of Lares.

In 1872, Spanish telegrapher and journalist José Manuel Pérez Moris, a contemporary who had migrated to Puerto Rico from Cuba in 1869, described the flag in his chronicle about the revolt, Historia de la Insurrección de Lares (History of the Insurrection of Lares), as follows:

"Es una bandera puertorriqueña de los independientes de Lares…la bandera, aunque tiene los colores y la estrella de la llamada Cubana, se diferencia de aquella…el cuerpo de ella lo forma una cruz latina blanca que la atraviesa entera en su longitud y latitud…los cuatro ángulos rectos que deja la cruz blanca arriba y abajo, los ocupan otros tantos cuadriláteros de color azul los primeros, y de color punzó los segundos. En uno de los cuadriláteros azules, en el de la derecha, hay una magnifica estrella blanca, bordada…"

— Historia de la Insurrección de Lares, 1872

which, translated in English, reads as:

"It is a Puerto Rican flag of the independents of Lares…the flag, although it has the colors and the star of the so-called Cuban flag, differs from that one…its body is formed by a white Latin cross that crosses it entirely in length and width…the four right angles left by the white cross above and below are occupied by four quadrilaterals, the first ones blue, and the second ones crimson. In one of the blue quadrilaterals, on the right, there is a magnificent white star, embroidered…"

— Historia de la Insurrección de Lares, 1872

In 1908, after the death of Iturriaga in Spain, the flag was donated by his son to the Museo de Artillería (Museum of the Artillery) in Madrid, alongside a copy of Historia de la Insurrección de Lares (History of the Insurrection of Lares) autographed by Pérez Moris, who had dedicated the book to Iturriaga. The flag was later transferred to the Museo del Ejército (Museum of the Army) in Madrid.

In 1931, Spanish-Puerto Rican historian Enrique Tomás Blanco Géigel described the flag in an article for the magazine Alma Latina titled La Bandera de Puerto Rico (The Flag of Puerto Rico). A picture of the second graduating class of the law school at the University of Puerto Rico holding a replica of the flag is featured in the publication. Blanco’s description of the flag is as follows:

"La bandera de Lares… enterrada en el barrio del Palomar por Hernández…tuvo su origen en la dominicana y en la de la Demajagua de Cuba, semejante a la de Chile, y en ella, los dos cuarteles azules iban colocados en el extremo inmediato al asta, con una estrella blanca de cinco puntas en el superior, y los dos cuarteles rojos en el extremo opuesto. Una cruz blanca la atravesaba en toda su longitud y latitud…"

— La Bandera de Puerto Rico, 1931

which, translated in English, reads as:

"The flag of Lares…buried in the Palomar neighborhood by Hernández…had its origin in the Dominican and in that of the Demajagua of Cuba, similar to that of Chile, and in it, the two blue quarters were placed at the end closest to the pole, with a five-pointed white star at the top, and the two red quarters at the opposite end. A white cross crossed it in all its length and width…"

— La Bandera de Puerto Rico, 1931

In 1970, Puerto Rican scholar and head of the Institute of Puerto Rican Culture at the University of Puerto Rico, Ricardo Alegría, requested and received pictures of the flag from Spanish historian Juan Manuel Zapatero at the (Museum of the Army) in Madrid. However, Alegría did not produce any official documentation of the flag.

Since 2010, the flag has been exhibited in Toledo, Spain, which is where the Museum of the Army relocated. In 2020, Luis Sorando Muzás, expert in vexillology and advisor to the Museum of the Army, published the flag as part of a catalog on the flags and banners in the museum.

In 2023, Puerto Rican investigative historian and founder of the Archivo Digital Nacional de Puerto Rico (ADNPR) (National Digital Archive of Puerto Rico), Joseph Harrison Flores, described the flag as "la verdadera bandera de Lares" ("the real flag of Lares"). In his book La Indentidad de Brazo de Oro ("The Identity of the Golden Arm"), Harrison Flores identified the flag as the original one created by the revolutionary forces of the “Republic of Puerto Rico” that was to be born from the Grito de Lares (Cry of Lares) revolt in 1868, as its authenticity is proven by written primary sources.

==== Inauthentic flag ====
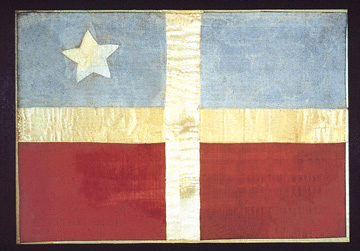
Inauthentic flag of the Grito de Lares (1868)

A second flag claimed to have been used during the Grito de Lares (Cry of Lares) revolt is in the possession of the University of Puerto Rico. While widely accepted as the original flag of the revolt and independent "Republic of Puerto Rico," the flag has not only never been authenticated by written primary sources, but it has also been discredited as a forgery. The flag is quartered by a centered white cross, with two bottom red rectangles and two top light blue rectangles, the left of which bears a tiled, centered, five-pointed white star.

In 1954, the flag, a poster of the revolutionaries, and a map of the main island depicting military operational plans for the revolt were acquired by the Museum of History, Anthropology and Art of the University of Puerto Rico in Río Piedras, Puerto Rico from Fordham University in New York City. With the arrival of the flag and supporting documents, the director of the museum, scholar Ricardo Alegría, prepared a press release, which is the only document available that explains the supposed origins of the flag. According to Alegría, the flag was taken from the altar of the San José Parish in Lares by Cabo Rojo mayor, Captain José de Perignat, who kept it until his family donated it to Fordham University.

In 1937, the flag was offered for sale to the government of the Dominican Republic. After his evaluation of the flag, Robert H. Todd, Puerto Rican revolutionary leader who was a member of Revolutionary Committee of Puerto Rico, presented his findings in an El Mundo article titled "Han intentado vender en Santo Domingo una supuesta bandera de Lares” ("They have tried to sell a supposed Lares flag in Santo Domingo"). Todd dismissed the flag as fake, labeling it "apócrifa" ("apocryphal"). The Dominican Academy of History agreed with Todd's conclusion that "la bandera obra de la incoerente tradición…no resiste una sola de las pruebas a que se le somete" ("The flag, the work of inconsistent tradition...does not withstand a single one of the tests to which it is subjected").

Since 1954, the content of the press release by Alegría has been popularly elevated to a historic fact by subsequent repetition in textbooks, essays, political speeches, and commemorative acts. However, in 2023, Puerto Rican investigative historian and founder of the Archivo Digital Nacional de Puerto Rico (ADNPR) (National Digital Archive of Puerto Rico), Joseph Harrison Flores, explained in his book La Indentidad de Brazo de Oro ("The Identity of the Golden Arm") that while the account presented by Alegría is preeminently established in the collective memory of the people of Puerto Rico, there is no documentary evidence to authenticate the flag nor its history.

Other historians claim that despite the absence of primary sources to validate the flag, there is a long oral tradition of testimonies that authenticate it.

=== Replaced flag ===
The Grito de Lares flag was replaced by a new revolutionary flag, which is the current flag of Puerto Rico. In December 1895, Juan de Mata Terreforte and other exiled Puerto Rican revolutionaries, many of them veterans of the Grito de Lares (Cry of Lares) revolt who fought alongside commander Manuel Rojas Luzardo, re-established the Revolutionary Committee of Puerto Rico under the name Sección Puerto Rico del Partido Revolucionario Cubano (Puerto Rico Section of the Cuban Revolutionary Party) as part of the Cuban Revolutionary Party in New York City, where they continued to advocate for Puerto Rican independence from Spain with the support of Cuban national hero José Martí and other Cuban exiles, who similarly began their struggle for self-determination in 1868 when the Grito de Yara (Cry of Yara) revolt triggered the Ten Years' War (Guerra de los Diez Años) for independence against Spanish rule in Cuba, which, along with Puerto Rico, represented all that remained from Spain's once extensive American empire since 1825.

Determined to affirm the strong bonds existing between Cuban and Puerto Rican revolutionaries, and the union of Cuban and Puerto Rican struggles for national independence and fights against Spanish colonialism, on December 22, with the knowledge and approval of their fellow Cuban rebels, Terreforte, vice-president of the committee, and around fifty-eight fellow members gathered at the no longer existent Chimney Corner Hall in Manhattan, unanimously adopted the Cuban flag with colors inverted as the new revolutionary flag to represent a sovereign "Republic of Puerto Rico", replacing the Lares flag, which had been used by revolutionaries as the flag of a prospective independent Puerto Rico since their attempt at self-determination in 1868, but was eventually rejected, as it represented a failed revolt, a sentiment strongly supported by Lola Rodríguez de Tío, Puerto Rican poet, pro-independence leader, and committee member, who spent her later life exiled in liberated Cuba.

== Symbolism ==
=== Independence and Antillean confederation ===
In 1868, Puerto Rican pro-independence leader Ramón Emeterio Betances, urged Eduviges Beauchamp Sterling to knit the revolutionary flag of the Grito de Lares (Cry of Lares), using as design the quartered flag of the First Dominican Republic and the lone star of the Cuban flag, with the aim of promoting Betances' idea of uniting the three neighboring Spanish-speaking Caribbean Greater Antilles of Puerto Rico, Cuba, and the Dominican Republic into an Antillean Confederation for the protection and preservation of their sovereignty and interests.

=== Colors ===
According to Puerto Rican poet Luis Lloréns Torres, the white cross stands for the yearning of homeland redemption, the red rectangles for the blood poured by the heroes of the revolt, and the white star for liberty and freedom. It is assumed that like the blue triangle on the current of Puerto Rico, the blue rectangles represent the sky and waters of the island.

== Dimensions ==
No official document in Puerto Rico provides the exact dimensions of the flag's shape, cross, and five-pointed star. While the exact proportions of the flag have not been established by law, the most commonly used and widely accepted layout of the flag is as follows:

At a length-to-width ratio of 2:3, the shape of the flag is rectangular, one and a half times longer than wide, composed of four equal rectangles, two blue on the top, the left of which bears a large, sharp, upright, centered, five-pointed white star which diameter is one-third of the flag width, and two red on the bottom, all four being nine-fourths of the flag length and twelves-fifths of the flag width, and a large white greek cross in the center touching all four sides of the flag, with its vertical post width being one-ninth of the flag length and horizontal crossbar width one-sixth of the flag width.

Construction sheet of the Grito de Lares flag featuring its current dimensions

Most representations of the flag follow these specifications, with the components likely to vary being the size of the cross and star. The width of the cross is occasionally displayed bigger than the most commonly used size of one-ninth (1/9) of the flag length for its vertical post width and one-sixth (1/6) of the flag width for its horizontal crossbar width, and the diameter of the star is occasionally displayed smaller than the most commonly used size of one-third (1/3) of the flag width.

== Colors ==
No official document in Puerto Rico provides the colors of the flag. While the exact colors of the flag have not been established by law, below are the most commonly used color shades. The intensity of both blue and red color shades changes to keep them complementary to each other.

=== Current medium blue flag ===
Current Grito de Lares flag with Puerto Rican blue shade, matching the current flag of Puerto Rico and Lares

Medium blue, or royal blue, Grito de Lares flag, matching the current flag of Puerto Rico and Lares, uses the following color shades:

Colors scheme	Blue	Red	White
RGB	868,255	237,0,0	255-255-255
Hexadecimal	#0044ff	#ed0000	#ffffff
CMYK	100-73-0-0	0-100-100-7	0-0-0-0
Pantone	285 C	2347 C	11-0601 TX Bright White

=== Dark blue flag ===
Dark blue Grito de Lares flag, matching the dark blue flag of Puerto Rico

Dark blue, or navy blue, Grito de Lares flag, matching the dark blue flag of Puerto Rico and the original dark blue Grito de Lares flag exhibited in Spain, the authenticated original version of the flag available today, uses the following color shades:

Colors scheme	Blue	Red	White
RGB	056,167	206,17,39	255-255-255
Hexadecimal	#0038a7	#ce1127	#ffffff
CMYK	100-66-0-35	0-92-81-19	0-0-0-0
Pantone	293 C	186 C	11-0601 TX Bright White

=== Light blue flag ===
The light blue Grito de Lares flag has become increasingly popular in recent years. Today, most representations of the flag feature a light sky blue color shade, matching the light blue color shade of the light blue Grito de Lares flag exhibited in Puerto Rico. The authenticity of this rendition has been called into question, though testimonies of oral tradition support its validity.

Light blue Grito de Lares flag with light blue shade

Light blue, or sky blue, variation of light blue Grito de Lares flag matching the colors of the light blue flag of Puerto Rico and the light blue Grito de Lares flag exhibited in Puerto Rico, uses the following color shades:

Colors scheme	Blue	Red	White
RGB	135-206-250	206-0-0	255-255-255
Hexadecimal	#87CEFA	#CE0000	#ffffff
CMYK	46-18-0-2	0-100-100-19	0-0-0-0
Pantone	2905 U	3517 C	11-0601 TX Bright White
