= Revolutionary Committee of Puerto Rico =

Committee in favor of Puerto Rican independence

- Comité Revolucionario de Puerto Rico
- Coat of Arms of the Revolutionary Committee of Puerto Rico as the Puerto Rico Section of the Cuban Revolutionary Party, 1898
- Abbreviation: CRPR
- Merged into: Cuban Revolutionary Party in 1892 as an affiliate under the name Club Borinquen and in 1895 as a segment under the name Sección de Puerto Rico del Partido Revolucionario Cubano (Puerto Rico Section of the Cuban Revolutionary Party)
- Formation: January 8, 1867
- Founder: Exiled Puerto Rican revolutionaries, including Segundo Ruiz Belvis, Ramón Emeterio Betances, and Juan Ríus Rivera
- Founded at: New York City in 1867, 1892, and 1895
- Dissolved: December 23, 1898
- Type: Political organisation

The Revolutionary Committee of Puerto Rico (Spanish: Comité Revolucionario de Puerto Rico, CRPR) was founded on January 8, 1867, by pro-independence Puerto Rican exiles such as Segundo Ruiz Belvis, Ramón Emeterio Betances, Juan Ríus Rivera, and José Francisco Basora living at the time in New York City. It was re-established as an affiliate of the Cuban Revolutionary Party under the name Club Borinquén in 1892 and as a segment of said Cuban party under the name Sección de Puerto Rico del Partido Revolucionario Cubano (Puerto Rico Section of the Cuban Revolutionary Party) in 1895. The goal of the committee was to create a united effort by Cubans and Puerto Ricans to win independence from Spain in the second half of the 19th century.

In 1868, Puerto Rico and Cuba, representing all that remained from Spain's once extensive American empire since 1825, began their struggle for independence. The revolutionary committee not only organized two revolts against Spanish rule in Puerto Rico, the Grito de Lares (Cry of Lares) of 1868 and the Intentona de Yauco (The Attempted Coup of Yauco) of 1897, but it also gave financial support and weaponry to the Cuban independence efforts early in the Cuban Ten Years' War. Such weaponry included 400 Enfield rifles, 45 snider rifles, 110 carbines, 87 handguns and one cannon with 200 shells, culminated from hidden caches on Saint Thomas, Curaçao, and Haiti.

On December 22, 1895, the committee, with many of its members exiled in New York City alongside fellow Cuban revolutionaries, including Cuban national hero José Martí, officially became part of the Cuban Revolutionary Party. On the same day, a quarter of a century after establishing the Grito de Lares flag as the national flag of an independent Puerto Rico, the committee approved the current design of the flag of Puerto Rico as the new revolutionary flag to represent a sovereign "Republic of Puerto Rico".

== Grito de Lares ==
On September 23, 1868, the Revolutionary Committee, led by Betances, declared independence in the city of Lares, Puerto Rico, calling it the Republic of Puerto Rico. Some 400–600 rebels gathered in the vicinity of Pezuela, on the outskirts of Lares. The rebels walked and rode to the town, arriving by midnight. The forces took over city hall and looted stores and offices owned by "peninsulares" or the Spanish-born, taking some of the store owners prisoner. By 2:00 AM, the Republic of Puerto Rico was proclaimed under the presidency of Francisco Ramírez Medina. The revolt was crushed by the Spanish militia, with some 475 rebels imprisoned. The event became known as the Grito de Lares (Cry of Lares).

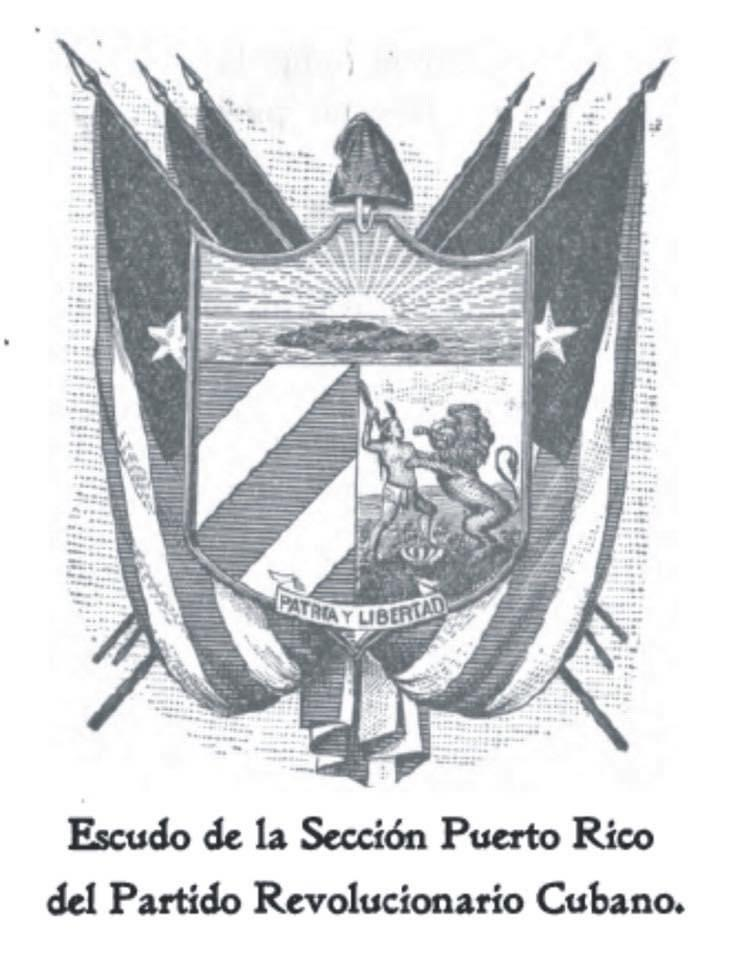
Coat of arms of the committee, representing an independent Republic of Puerto Rico, features, atop the motto "Patria y Libertad" ("Homeland and Liberty"), the flag of Puerto Rico, the island in front of a rising sun, the three red (blood of warriors), and two white (peace after independence) stripes of the flag, and the lion of the Spanish Kingdom being wrestled by leading resistance Taino warrior of Borinquén, Agüeybaná II, who is standing on the lion's fallen crown

== New York City ==
On December 22, 1895, under the name Sección Puerto Rico del Partido Revolucionario Cubano (Puerto Rico Section of the Cuban Revolutionary Party), the Puerto Rican Revolutionary Committee was re-established as part of the Partido Revolucionario Cubano (Cuban Revolutionary Party) in New York City, where many Puerto Rican and Cuban exiles had gathered. On the same day, Juan de Mata Terreforte and fellow members of the revolutionary committee, many of them veterans of the Grito de Lares (Cry of Lares) revolt, assembled at the longer existent Chimney Corner Hall in Manhattan, substituted the Grito de Lares flag and adopted the Cuban flag with colors inverted as the new revolutionary flag to represent a prospective "Republic of Puerto Rico". Recognized as the flag of Puerto Rico by the majority of the Puerto Rican people since its adoption in 1895, it officially became the standard of the island in 1952.

Historian Cayetano Coll y Toste, identified the fifty members present at adoption of the flag as follows: Arturo Labarthe, A. P. de Mena, Ges A. Amy, Epifanio Alvira, Pedro Martínez, Rafael Martínez, Enrique R. Balaguer, J. B. Pérez, Gustavo J. Steinacher, J. Cortada, A. C. Lamoutte, Ulises Valdivieso, Manuel Besosa, J. J. Henna, J. M. Terreforte, J. D. Delgado, Julio Crespo, R. H. Todd, Luis E. Acosta, Luis Castro López, Crispín Cervera, José Rivera, Joaquín Ramos, Manuel Román, Juan Curet, Francisco Moreno, Valentín París, Clemente R. Lecompte, Arturo Font, Sotero Figueroa, José Budet, S. Moret Muñoz, Pedro Modesto Giraud, J. J. Bas, Sandalio Parrilla, J. Martorell, Eduardo Ferrer, J. A. Vera, Arturo Méndez, Gumersindo Rivas, E. López, Edelmiro Espada, E. Martorell, Arturo de Castro, Ramón Olmo, Castro, Federico Pacheco, M. M. Loubriel, Cayetano Soler, and Gerardo Forrest.

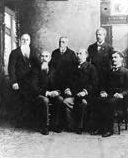
Puerto Rican Revolutionary Committee in New York. Standing L-R: Manuel Besosa, Aurelio Méndez Martínez, and Sotero Figueroa; seated L-R: Juan de Mata Terreforte, Jose Julio Henna and Roberto H. Todd

== Intentona de Yauco ==
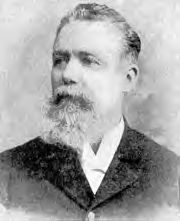
Antonio Mattei Lluberas

In 1897, Antonio Mattei Lluberas visited the Puerto Rican Revolutionary Committee in New York City, where he met with Emiterio Betances, Terreforte, and Méndez Martinez to plan for a major revolt. Betances was to direct it, Mendez Mercado would organize it, and General Rius Rivera would command the armed forces. At the time, Ríus Rivera, who had joined the Cuban Liberation Army and José Martí's struggle for Cuban independence, was the Commander-in-Chief of the Cuban Liberation Army of the West.

Mattei Lluberas purchased 30,000 machetes, which were to be distributed amongst the rebels. He returned to Puerto Rico with a Puerto Rican flag and began to proceed with the rebellion plans. The Spanish authorities found out about their plans. Mattei Lluberas demanded that the insurrection start immediately rather than in December. The other leaders feared that such a haste action would lead to the same disastrous results experienced during Grito de Lares (Cry of Lares) revolt.

Mattei Lluberas and the Puerto Rican Commission in New York had been trying to convince President William McKinley to invade Puerto Rico for some time. After the U.S. took control of Cuba, McKinley approved the invasion of Puerto Rico. A convoy of ships left Tampa, Florida and on July 21 another convoy departed from Guantánamo for a 4-day journey to Puerto Rico. Under the terms of the Treaty of Paris of 1898, ratified on December 10, 1898, the United States annexed Puerto Rico.

== See also ==
- El Grito de Lares
- Intentona de Yauco
- Puerto Rican independence movement
- Ramón Emeterio Betances
- List of Puerto Ricans
- List of Puerto Rican military personnel
