= Intentona de Yauco =

Second and final revolt against Spanish rule in Puerto Rico

- Part of the Independence movement in Puerto Rico
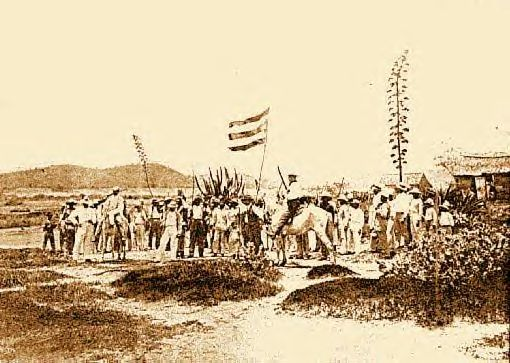
- Intentona de Yauco, c. 1897
Date	March 24, 1897 (first group); March 26, 1897 (second group)
Location	Yauco, Puerto Rico
Result	Spanish victory

Belligerents
Spanish Empire: Captaincy General of Puerto Rico	Puerto Rican revolutionaries

Strength
Infantry, Civil Guard, and auxiliaries (at least 225 men in the regional operation); 30 Civil Guard cavalry (reinforcements)	First group: 60–70 men Second group: 50 men

Casualties and losses
Not reported	148+ rebels captured

Municipality of Yauco within Puerto Rico highlighted in red

The Intentona de Yauco (Attempted Coup of Yauco) of March 24–26, 1897 was the second and final short-lived revolt against Spanish rule in Puerto Rico. It was staged by the pro-independence Revolutionary Committee of Puerto Rico in the southwestern municipality of Yauco, 29 years after the first unsuccessful revolt, known as the Grito de Lares (Cry of Lares). During the Intentona de Yauco, the current flag of Puerto Rico was flown on the island for the first time.

The first major revolt in 1868 is known as Grito de Lares. After the failure of this short-lived rebellion, many of the local leaders and participants were arrested, and some were executed. Those who survived their prison terms were later released and some went into exile, especially in New York City.

Shortly after the 1868 revolt, Spain gave the island many liberal reforms. It extended to Puerto Rico some elements of the liberal constitution that it had allowed its former colonies in South America. Political reforms included allowing Puerto Ricans to participate in special elections and to organize officially recognized political parties. During the following years, the minor protests against centralist rule that arose in various towns of the island were quickly subdued by the authorities.

Leaders of El Grito de Lares who were in exile in New York City joined the Puerto Rican Revolutionary Committee, founded on December 8, 1895 to continue the quest for independence. In 1897, with the aid of the local leaders of the independence movement of the town of Yauco, they organized another uprising, which became known as the Intentona de Yauco. The local autonomist political factions, which believed that such an attempt would be a threat to their struggle for political autonomy, opposed such an action. Rumors of the planned event spread to the local authorities, who acted swiftly and put an end to what would be the last major uprising in the island against Spanish centralist rule.

== Prelude ==
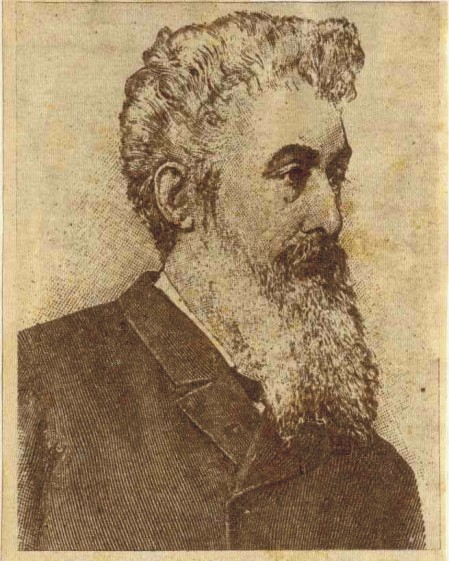
Dr. Ramón Emeterio Betances

Despite liberal reforms enacted by the Spanish government, political tensions along with social and economic inequalities persisted under colonial rule. For years following the uprisings, Puerto Ricans did not have autonomy within the Spanish government on the island and pleaded for representation. After King Ferdinand VII's death in 1833, Queen Mother Maria Christina of Bourbon reinstated the Cortes, the national legislative body, and invited representatives from Spain and its colonies. Despite the invitation, representatives from Cuba, Puerto Rico, and the Philippines were not included in the process of creating a new Spain constitution in 1837. The Cortes then invited representatives from the Spanish colonies to defend their stances on gaining greater autonomy and independence for their respective lands. During a Cortes meeting in 1867, Puerto Ricans proposed colonial reforms to increase the quality of life and autonomy, which were ultimately dismissed. Along with growing mass frustrations due to the treatment by the Spanish crown, some Puerto Ricans began to organize and dedicate their lives to gaining independence for the island through revolution, leading to the Grito de Lares in 1868 and Intentona de Yauco in 1897.

On September 23, 1868, the first major uprising against Spanish colonial rule in Puerto Rico occurred in the town of Lares. The uprising, which was planned by Puerto Rican patriots, Dr. Ramón Emeterio Betances and Segundo Ruiz Belvis, was carried out by several revolutionary cells in the island led by Manuel Rojas, Mathias Brugman, Mariana Bracetti, Juan Ríus Rivera, Juan de Mata Terreforte and Aurelio Méndez Martinez, among others. They took control of Lares and then left to take over the next town, San Sebastián del Pepino. The Spanish militia surprised the group with strong resistance, causing great confusion among the armed rebels. Led by Manuel Rojas, they retreated to Lares. The governor Julián Pavía ordered the Spanish militia to round up the rebels and quickly brought the insurrection to an end.

Some 475 rebels, among them Manuel Rojas, Mariana Bracetti and Juan Rius Rivera, were held in the local prison of the city of Arecibo. On November 17, a military court convicted them for treason and sedition and sentenced all the prisoners to death. Meanwhile, in Madrid, Eugenio María de Hostos and other prominent Puerto Ricans were successful in interceding with President Francisco Serrano, who had just led a revolution against the monarchy of Spain. In an effort to lower the tension on the island, the incoming governor, José Laureano Sanz, granted a general amnesty early in 1869 and all prisoners were released. Betances, Rojas, Rius Rivera, Terreforte, Méndez Martínez and many more were sent into exile.

The Spanish Crown feared losing the only two colonies which it had left in the Western Hemisphere, Puerto Rico and Cuba to independence insurgents. As a result of the Lares uprising, Spain granted Puerto Rico provincial status and its native residents were given Spanish citizenship. Puerto Ricans were allowed to participate in special elections and to organize officially recognized political parties.

Lares and Yauco, the towns were these revolts occurred, were vital to coffee production in Puerto Rico, particularly as the demand for coffee increased during the nineteenth century. As coffee became more valuable and prices increased, more land was being devoted to planting and cultivation. This created significant social and economic changes throughout Puerto Rico. The coffee industry also relied on merchants, including immigrant merchants who were important for financing the industry and distributing coffee outside of the island. As the commercial coffee industry expanded, there was less land available for farming. This left rural families with fewer resources to grow food for their households. These changes helped contribute to the growing population of landless agricultural workers who depended on wages rather than having access to land of their own. This was particularly evident in Yauco, where the number of jornaleros increased from 609 in 1860 to 3,165 in 1879. The number of landowners decreased from 1,091 to 919 during the time frame.

== Political and pro-independence protests and skirmishes ==
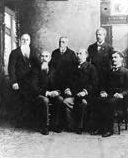
Puerto Rican Revolutionary Committee (standing L-R) Manuel Besosa, Aurelio Méndez Martínez, and Sotero Figueroa (seated L-R) Juan de Mata Terreforte, Dr. José Julio Henna and Roberto H. Todd

During the years immediately following the Grito, there were minor pro-independence protests and skirmishes with the Spanish authorities in Las Marías, Adjuntas, Utuado, Vieques, Bayamón, Ciales and Toa Baja (Palo Seco).

In July 1871, a group of people attacked Spanish soldiers and members of the local militia in San Juan, Puerto Rico's capital. Lieutenant General Gabriel Baldrich, the Spanish-appointed governor, declared martial law. Some of the protests were between the liberal and conservative political factions of the island and were not related to the pro-independence movement. Among these were the "Motín de Yabucoa" of 1871, and La Estrella and the Sucesos de Camuy of 1873.

From the 1860s through the Spanish-American War, Puerto Rican supporters of indepedence were active in exile communities particularly in New York. On December 8, 1867, the Puerto Rican Revolutionary Committee was founded in New York City, where many exiles had gathered. The founding members were Ramón Emeterio Betances, Segundo Ruiz Belvis, and Jose Francisco Basora.This group promoted the ideal of Puerto Rican independence from Spain. It included as members such participants of El Grito de Lares as Juan Ríus Rivera, Juan de Mata Terreforte and Aurelio Méndez Martínez The committee promoted cooperation between Cuban and Puerto Rican independence movements and helped raise funds for Grito de Lares then the future Intentona de Yauco. Decades later, during the Cuban War of Independence, José Martí Cuban Revolutionary Council also supported Puerto Rican's fight for independence. A Puerto Rican section of this party was established in New York by Julio J. Henna and a few hundred of Puerto Ricans joined the Cuban Rebel Army.

The Committee named Terreforte as its Vice-President. In 1892, Terreforte and the members of the Revolutionary Committee adopted the design of a flag similar to the Cuban flag but with its colors inverted. This new flag, to represent the Republic of Puerto Rico, is still used on the island.

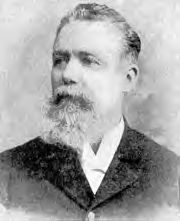
Antonio Mattei Lluberas

In 1896, a group of Yaucanos (as the natives of Yauco are known) who supported full independence of Puerto Rico joined forces and met in Barrio Barinas where they made plans to overthrow the government. The group was led by Antonio Mattei Lluberas, a wealthy coffee plantation planter, and Mateo Mercado. On December of that year, the local Civil Guard discovered their plans and proceeded to arrest all those involved, including additional members Darío and Carlos Franchesi and Emiliano Lavergue. They were soon released and returned home.

In 1897, Antonio Mattei Lluberas visited the Puerto Rican Revolutionary Committee in New York City. There he met with Betances, Terreforte and Méndez Martínez; together they planned a major coup. Betances was to direct it, Méndez Mercado would organize it, and General Rius Rivera would command the armed forces. At the time Rius Rivera, who had joined the Cuban Liberation Army and José Martí's struggle for Cuban independence, was the Commander-in-Chief of the Cuban Liberation Army of the West.

Although Puerto Rican independence was supported by exiled activists and revolutionaries, it remained a minority position of the island. Social and political discontent under Spanish colonial persisted nevertheless. Landowners and merchants were benefited the most from the colonial system as mass frustrations grew among parts of the rural population, particularly in southwestern Puerto Rico. The most prominent organizer of Intentona de Yauco was Antonio Mattei Lluberas. He was a Puerto Rican landowner of Corsican ancestry. He recruited Cuban and Dominican revolutionaries to help organize an armed rebellion but was not successful in securing participation among Puerto Ricans on the island.

Mattei Lluberas purchased 30,000 machetes, which were to be distributed among the rebels. He returned to Puerto Rico with a Puerto Rican flag and began to proceed with the rebellion plans. The Budet Rivera brothers established an insurgent training camp on the farm of Guillermo Velazco. Fellow rebels Gerardo Forest Vélez and Agustín F. Morales (a general in the Army of the Dominican Republic) were in charge of propaganda. They traveled throughout the island seeking public support for their cause. The Cuban revolutionist Tomás Estrada Palma offered a contribution of 500 rifles with half a million rounds of ammunition and one of his comrades offered a steamship staffed with an invading force of 200 men under the command of General Morales. The revolution was set for the beginning of December 1897.

By this time, Luis Muñoz Rivera and his Autonomist Party had signed a pact with Práxedes Mateo Sagasta, the leader of the Spanish Liberal Party. Sagasta had promised that if he and the liberals assumed power in Spain he would grant Puerto Rico autonomy. Major political leaders of Puerto Rico believed that seeking full independence at this time would threaten their work to gain autonomy and risk severe repression by the Spanish authorities. When the Mayor of Yauco, Francisco Lluch Barreras, heard rumors of the planned uprising he immediately notified General Sabas Marín González, the governor of the island.

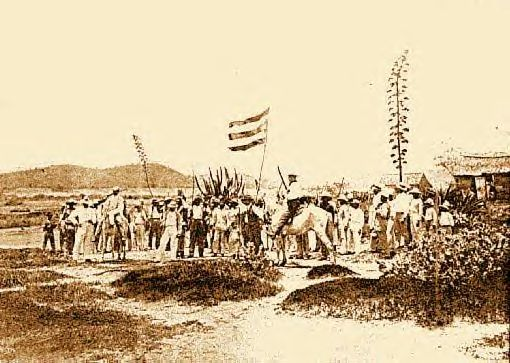
Flag flown by Fidel Vélez and his men during the "Intentona de Yauco" revolt

Fidel Vélez, one of the separatist leaders, found out that the Spanish authorities knew about their plans and quickly met with Mattei Lluberas and the other leaders. Fearing pending arrest, he demanded that the insurrection start immediately rather than in December. The other leaders feared that such a hasty action would lead to the same disastrous results as had occurred during El Grito de Lares.

On March 24, 1897, Fidel Vélez and José "Aguila Blanca" Maldonado Román met a small army of 60-70 men just outside the town of Yauco at Susúa Arriba where they unfurled the Puerto Rican flag for the first time on the island and marched toward the town. They planned to attack the barracks of the Spanish Civil Guard to gain control of the arms and ammunition stored there. Upon their arrival they were ambushed by the Spanish forces, who had already set up defensive positions. After a firefight, the rebels quickly retreated.

On March 26, another group, headed by José Nicolás Quiñones Torres and Ramón Torres, attacked the Spaniards in the Quebradas barrio of Yauco with 50 men; they were defeated. Over 150 rebels were arrested, convicted of various crimes against the state, and sent to prison in the city of Ponce. Vélez fled to St. Thomas where he lived in exile while Mattei Lluberas went into exile in New York City and joined a group known as the "Puerto Rican Commission".

== Aftermath ==
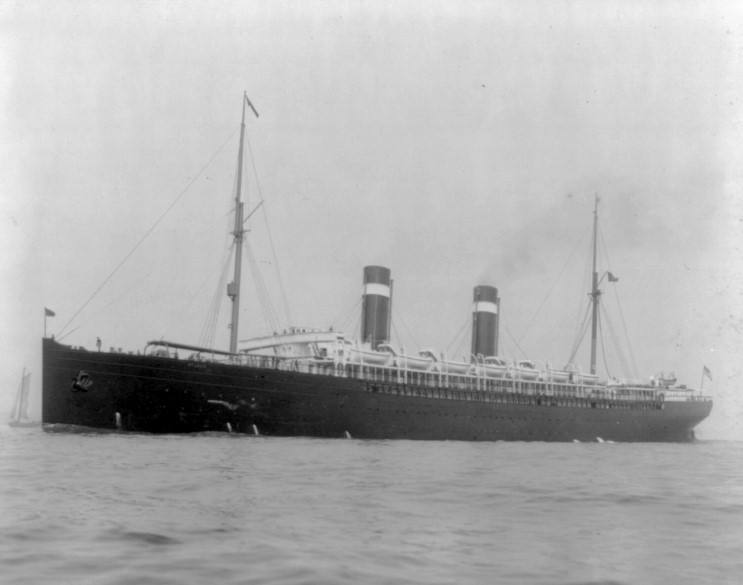
USS St. Louis

Sagasta's party won the elections in Spain and on November 25, 1897, Spain granted Puerto Rico autonomy. Muñoz Rivera served as Secretary of Grace, Justice and Government; and Chief of the Cabinet for the independent Government of Puerto Rico. In December 1897, those who had participated in the Intentona de Yauco were granted clemency and released from jail.

Following the sinking of the battleship Maine in Havana, Cuba, the United States forwarded an ultimatum to Spain to withdraw from Cuba. In response, Spain broke off diplomatic relations with the US and, April 23, 1898, Spain declared war. On April 25, the U.S. Congress declared that a state of war between the United States and Spain had existed since April 20. One of the United States' principal objectives in the Spanish–American War was to take control of Spanish colonies in the Atlantic: Puerto Rico and Cuba.

Mattei Lluberas and the Puerto Rican Commission in New York had been trying to convince President William McKinley to invade Puerto Rico for some time. After the US took control of Cuba, McKinley approved the invasion of Puerto Rico. A convoy of ships left Tampa, Florida and on July 21 another convoy departed from Guantánamo for a 4-day journey to Puerto Rico. Major General Nelson A. Miles, Commanding General of the Army, landed his troops in the southern region of the island, picking Guánica, at the time a part of the municipality of Yauco, as his landing zone. On July 31, 1898, Mattei Lluberas and his group arrived in Ponce aboard the USS St. Louis and were assigned to the headquarters of General Miles. On August 13, the Puerto Rican Campaign came to an end.

Under the terms of the Treaty of Paris of 1898, ratified on December 10, 1898, the United States annexed Puerto Rico. In 1904, Mattei Lluberas was elected as Mayor of Yauco representing the pro-statehood Republican Party of Puerto Rico. Mattei Lluberas died on January 15, 1908. Fidel Vélez returned to Sabana Grande, his native town, and lived there until 1950, when he died of natural causes at the age of 86.

== See also ==
- Military history of Puerto Rico
- Ramón Emeterio Betances
- Puerto Rican Nationalist Party Revolts of the 1950s
- Puerto Rico Independence Party
- Puerto Rican Nationalist Party
- List of revolutions and rebellions

Intento revolucionario reprimido en Yauco. 1897.
