= Sotero Figueroa =

Puerto Rican writer and politician (1851 - 1923)

- Sotero Figueroa at the Puerto Rican Revolutionary Committee in New York in 1895
- Born: 1851; Ponce, Puerto Rico
- Died: 1923 (aged 71–72); Havana, Cuba

Sotero Figueroa Hernández (1851 - October 5, 1923) was a Puerto Rican writer and politician. He became known for his work as a journalist, dramatist, speaker and author of biographical essays. He was also a loyal defender of Puerto Rican and Cuban independence. Figueroa died and was buried in Cuba in 1923.

== Early years ==
Figueroa was born in the city of Ponce, Puerto Rico, in 1851 and is believed to have studied at the Rafael Cordero school in San Juan. In his youth, he was apprenticed to the office of the typographer in the capital printing press of the liberal and Puerto Rican abolitionist, José Julián Acosta, a former student of maestro Rafael Cordero.

== Writing ==
Before moving to New York, Figueroa’s first job as a writer in Puerto Rico was in Ramon Marín’s print shop, Establicimiento Tipográphico; there he wrote pieces for La Crónica and El Pueblo and acted as editor of these in Marín's absence. Figueroa began a print shop, after moving to New York in 1889; Imprenta America would serve as the publishing house for revolutionary newspapers such as Jose Martí’s La Patria and El Porvernir. After the Cuban War of Independence, Figueroa moved to Cuba and often published articles in Cuban newspapers such as El Fígaro, La Discusíon, and La Gaceta. He died in 1923 and in 1977 his book, La Verdad De La Historia was published in Puerto Rico posthumously.

=== Ensayo Biográfico (Biographical Essay) ===
Months before he left Puerto Rico for the United States, Sotero began writing Ensayo Biográfico (Biographical Essay) in which there were biographical sketches of those “...who had most contributed to the progress of Puerto Rico." This work offers a set of laudatory biographies that acknowledge the heroism of several Puerto Rican Creoles. In the Biographical Essays, there are also passages about race, castes, and slavery in Puerto Rico citing laws that make poor black men inferior. As a black man living in Puerto Rico, he often wrote about how unfairly he and his fellow men were treated. This Essay is the best known work of Figueroa.

=== Don Mamerto ===
Figueroa also wrote the zarzuela, "Don Mamerto" in 1886, which was presented at the Teatro La Perla in Ponce, Puerto Rico with music by the Ponce composer, Juan Morel Campos. This work was a scathing satire of those who betray their ideals because of political opportunism, or by being blinded by materialism or social aspirations.

== Emigration and politics ==
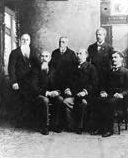
Sotero Figueroa (3rd standing, L-to-R) shown with the Puerto Rican Revolutionary Committee in New York in 1895

Figueroa emigrated to the city of New York in 1889. Arriving in New York City, he joined the Antillean separatist movement and established a close friendship with the exiled Cuban patriot, José Martí. There he met several other Puerto Rican patriots involved in the separatist movement, among them Francisco Gonzalo (Pachín) Marín and Arturo Alfonso Schomburg.

Sotero Figueroa’s writings were also tied to his political beliefs. Figueroa, Ramón Marín, and Francisco Gonzalo (Pachín) Marín together worked to reform politics in Puerto Rico in the late 1800s. Their mission was make equality a reality by expelling the ideals of rank and class and promoting instead a focus on “individual merit”. They believed that castes that existed were put on the public by Spanish colonial control and limited the Puerto Rican population’s growth economically, politically, and physically. At age 22, Figueroa was chosen as an assembly leader under Rafael Primo de Rivera, the new liberal Governor of Puerto Rico.

In 1892, he collaborated in the founding of the Club Borinquen, the first of several Puerto Rican pro-independence organizations affiliated with the Cuban Revolutionary Party (PRC). The PRC was founded by José Martí that same year to promote the independence of Cuba. Figueroa would later become secretary of the Executive Board of the PRC.
