= Ten Commandments of Free Men =

Proclamation published by Dr. Ramón Emeterio Betances in November 1867

The Ten Commandments of Free Men was a proclamation published by Dr. Ramón Emeterio Betances in November 1867 in order to encourage Puerto Ricans to aspire to independence from Spanish colonial rule.

== The Proclamation ==
"Puerto Ricans

The government of Mme. Isabella II throws upon us a terrible accusation.

It states that we are bad Spaniards. The government defames us.

We don't want separation, we want peace, the union to Spain; however, it is fair that we also add conditions to the contract. They are rather easy, here they are:

The abolition of slavery

The right to vote on all impositions

Freedom of religion

Freedom of speech

Freedom of the press

Freedom of trade

The right to assembly

Right to bear arms

Inviolability of the citizen

The right to choose our own authorities

These are the Ten Commandments of Free Men.

If Spain feels capable of granting us, and gives us, those rights and liberties, they may then send us a General Captain, a governor... made of straw, that we will burn in effigy come Carnival time, as to remember all the Judases that they have sold us until now.

That way we will be Spanish, and not otherwise.

If not, Puerto Ricans - HAVE PATIENCE!, for I swear that you will be free."
