= Ramón Emeterio Betances =

Puerto Rican independence advocate (1827–1898)

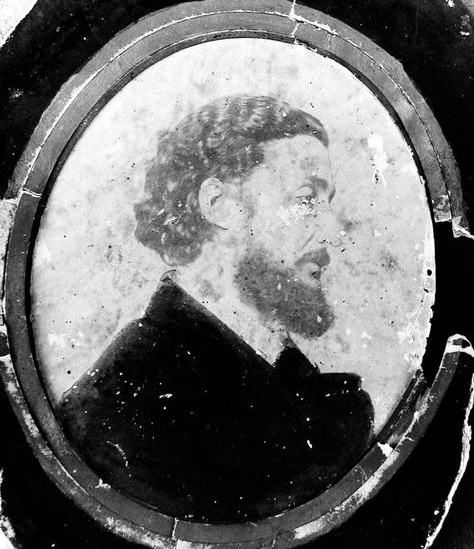
- Photo portrait of Betances, c.1860s
- Born: Ramón Emeterio Betances y Alacán; April 8, 1827; Cabo Rojo, Puerto Rico
- Died: September 16, 1898 (aged 71); Neuilly-sur-Seine, Hauts-de-Seine, France
- Occupations: Politician, physician, diplomat
- Partner: Simplicia Jiménez Carlo
- Parent(s): Felipe Betanzos Ponce; María del Carmen Alacán de Montalvo

Signature
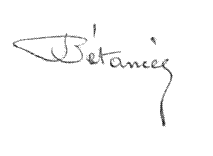

Ramón Emeterio Betances y Alacán (April 8, 1827 – September 16, 1898) was a Puerto Rican independence leader, abolitionist and medical doctor. He led the nation's independence movement and was the primary instigator of the Grito de Lares revolt and designer of the Lares flag. Betances is considered to be the father of the Puerto Rican revolutionary movement and El Padre de la Patria (The Father of the Homeland). His charitable deeds for people in need, earned him the moniker of El Médico de los Pobres (The Doctor of the Poor).

Betances was also a medical doctor and surgeon in Puerto Rico, and one of its first social hygienists. He had established a successful surgery and ophthalmology practice. Betances was also an abolitionist, diplomat, public health administrator, poet, and novelist. He served as representative and contact for Cuba and the Dominican Republic in Paris.

An adherent of Freemasonry, his political and social activism was deeply influenced by the group's philosophical beliefs.

== Early years ==
=== Ancestry ===
Betances was born in Cabo Rojo, Puerto Rico in the building that now houses the "Logia Cuna de Betances" ("Betances' Cradle Masonic Lodge"). Betances' parents were Felipe Betanzos Ponce, a merchant born in Hispaniola (in the part that would later become the Dominican Republic; the surname Betanzos transformed into Betances while the family resided there), and María del Carmen Alacán de Montalvo, a native of Cabo Rojo and of French ancestry. They were married later.

Betances claimed in his lifetime that a relative of his, Pedro Betances, had revolted against the Spanish government of Hispaniola in 1808 and was tortured, executed, and his body burned and shown to the populace to dissuade them from further attempts. Meanwhile, Alacán's father, a sailor, led a party of volunteers that tried to apprehend the pirate Roberto Cofresí y Ramírez de Arellano in 1824 and did arrest some of Cofresí's crew, for which he was honored by the Spanish government.

Betances was the fourth of six children; the oldest of which would die shortly after birth; Betances was the only male among the surviving siblings. The family was described as being of mixed race in records of the day. His mother died in 1837, when he was nine years old, and his father remarried in 1839; the five children he had with María del Carmen Torres Pagán included Ramón's half-brother Felipe Adolfo, who was not involved in politics (according to Ramón) but was nevertheless arrested following the Grito de Lares years later.

His father eventually bought the Hacienda Carmen in what would later become the nearby town of Hormigueros, and became a wealthy landowner. He owned 200 acres (0.8 km^{2}) of land, a small sugar mill, and some slaves, who shared their duties with free workers. There is speculation that he later freed his slaves, persuaded by his son Ramón.

=== First years in France ===
==== Primary education ====
The young Betances received his primary education from private tutors contracted by his father, a Freemason who owned the largest private library in town. His parents' attitude towards religion and civil authority shaped his personal beliefs in both subjects. His father would eventually send him to France, to study at the then-named "Collège Royal" (later named the Lycée Pierre-de-Fermat) in Toulouse when he was ten years old. A Franco-Puerto Rican family, Jacques Maurice Prévost and María Cavalliery Bey (who also was a native of Cabo Rojo) were appointed as his tutors. Prévost opened a drug store in Mayagüez, Puerto Rico, but was forced to return to France (particularly to his native town, Grisolles) for not having finished his pharmacy studies. There is also speculation that Prévost was a Freemason, as was Betances' father.

Betances accompanied the couple in Prévost's return to his country, and would be under their indirect tutelage while boarding at the school. He showed interest in natural and exact sciences early on, and also became a good fencer.

==== Legal "whitening" of family ====
While Ramón was in France, his father sought to move the family's registration from the "mixed race" to the "white" (Caucasian) classification of families in Cabo Rojo. The process, when successful, entitled the requester to further legal and property rights for him and his family, and was necessary to allow his daughter, Ana María, to marry José Tió, who was a Caucasian. In the case of Betances' father, the process lasted two years, and was formalized in 1840, but not before having to have the family's lineage and religious affiliations exposed to the general public, something that embarrassed them all. Betances was considerably annoyed by the entire ordeal, since he was the first to acknowledge that he and his entire family were not "blancuzcos" ("whitish", a legal term) but "prietuzcos" ("blackish", as Betances mocked it in his letters) instead. To him the procedure reeked of hypocrisy.

==== Medicine studies ====
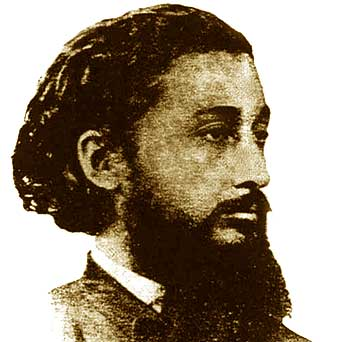
A younger Ramon Betances

In 1846, Betances obtained his baccalauréat (high school diploma). After an extended vacation in Puerto Rico, he went on to study medicine at the Faculty of Medicine of Paris from 1848 until 1855, with a short interlude at the Faculty of Medicine of Montpellier for specific courses in the summer of 1852.

At the time of his arrival in Paris, Betances witnessed the aftermath of the 1848 Revolution and its backlash, the June Days Uprising, earlier that year. His future political views were directly shaped by what he saw and experienced at the time. He himself "an old soldier of the French Republic". Inspired by the proclamation of the 2^{e} République, he rejected Puerto Rican aspirations for autonomy (sought from Spain by Puerto Rican politicians since 1810) in favor of Puerto Rican independence.

In 1856, he graduated with the titles of Doctor in Medicine and Surgeon. He was the second Puerto Rican to graduate from the University (after Pedro Gerónimo Goyco, a later political leader native of Mayagüez who would eventually interact with Betances when both returned to Puerto Rico). Among Betances' teachers were: Charles-Adolphe Wurtz, Jean Cruveilhier, Jean-Baptiste Bouillaud, Armand Trousseau, Alfred-Armand-Louis-Marie Velpeau and Auguste Nélaton.

==== Father's death and family's economic problems ====
While Betances was studying medicine in France, his father died (in August 1854) and his sister Ana María would be forced to take over the Hacienda Carmen's management. By 1857 the heirs were forced to give the operation's output to a holding company headed by Guillermo Schröeder.

== First return to Puerto Rico ==
=== Cholera epidemic of 1856 ===
Betances returned to Puerto Rico in April 1856. At the time, a cholera epidemic was spreading across the island. The epidemic made its way to Puerto Rico's western coast in July 1856, and hit the city of Mayagüez particularly hard. At the time, Betances was one of five doctors that would have to take care of 24,000 residents. Both he and Dr. José Francisco Basora (who became lifelong friends and colleagues from that point on) would alert the city government and press the city managers into taking preventive action.

An emergency subscription fund was established by some of the city's wealthiest citizens. Betances and Basora had the city's unsanitary slave barracks torched and a temporary camp set up for its dwellers. A large field at a corner of the city was set aside for a supplementary cemetery, and Betances set and managed a temporary hospital next to it (which was later housed in a permanent structure and became the Hospital San Antonio, the Mayagüez municipal hospital, which still serves the city). However, the epidemic struck the city soon after; Betances' stepmother and one of his brothers-in-law would die from it. By October 1856 Betances would have to take care of the entire operation on his own temporarily.

At the time, he had his first confrontation with Spanish authorities, since Betances gave last priority of medical treatment to those Spanish-born military rank and officers who were affected by the disease (they demanded preferential and immediate treatment, and he openly despised them for it). For his hard work to save many Puerto Ricans from the ravages of the cholera epidemic of 1856, Betances was commended by the city's government. However, when the central government established a Chief Surgeon post for the city, Betances (who was the acting chief surgeon) was passed over, in favor of a Spanish newcomer.

Basora and Betances were eventually honored with streets named after each in the city of Mayagüez. The main thoroughfare that crosses the city from north to south is named after Betances; a street that links the center of the city with the University of Puerto Rico at Mayagüez is named after Dr. Basora.

== Exile from and return to Puerto Rico ==
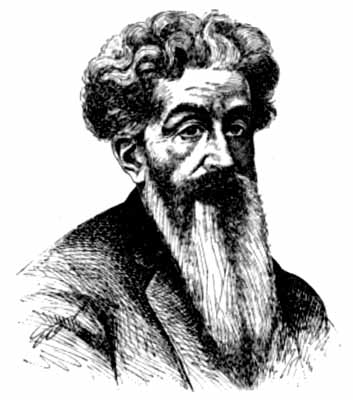
Dr. Ramón Emeterio Betances

=== Abolitionist ===
Betances believed in the abolition of slavery, inspired not only on written works by Victor Schœlcher, John Brown, Lamartine and Tapia, but also on personal experience, based on what he saw at his father's farm and in daily Puerto Rican life. Based on his beliefs, he founded a civic organization in 1856, one of many others that were later called the Secret Abolitionist Societies by historians. Little is known about them due to their clandestine nature, but Betances and Salvador Brau (a close friend who later became the official Historian of Puerto Rico) describe them in their writings. Some of these societies sought the freedom and free passage of maroons from Puerto Rico to countries where slavery had been abolished already; other societies sought to liberate as many slaves as possible by buying out their freedom.

The objective of the particular society Betances founded was to free children who were slaves, taking advantage of their need to receive the sacrament of Baptism at the town church, Nuestra Señora de la Candelaria, which is now the Roman Catholic Cathedral of Mayagüez. Since buying the freedom of slave children cost 50 pesos if the child had been baptized, and 25 pesos if the child had not, Betances, Basora, Segundo Ruiz Belvis and other members of the society waited next to the baptismal font on Sundays, expecting a master to take a slave family to baptize their child. Before the child was baptized, Betances or his partners gave money to the parents, which they in turn used to buy the child's freedom from his master. The child, once freed, was baptized minutes after. This action was later described as having the child receive the "aguas de libertad" (waters of liberty). Similar events occurred in the city of Ponce.

The baptismal font where these baptisms were performed still exists, and is owned by a local family of merchants, the Del Moral family, who keep it at their Mayagüez house.

As of 2007 the baptismal font has been donated to the Mayagüez Cathedral, Nuestra Señora de la Candelaria, by Doña Elda Del Moral. It had been in conservation from 1963 until donated.

=== La vierge de Boriquén (The Boriquén Virgin) ===
The Spanish governor of Puerto Rico, Fernando Cotoner, threatened Betances with exile in 1858 because of his abolitionist tactics. Betances took a leave of absence from his duties as director of the local hospital and again left Puerto Rico for France, followed by Basora. Soon, his half-sister Clara and her husband, Justine Hénri, would also leave for Paris with his niece, María del Carmen Hénri.

María del Carmen, nicknamed Lita, was born in 1838. She had met Betances when she was 10, and Betances became instantly fond of her. Once he returned to Puerto Rico from his medical studies he requested the necessary ecclesiastical permissions to marry her (due to the degree of consanguinity between them), which were granted in Rome (then part of the Papal States) after an extended delay. Their marriage was supposed to occur on May 5, 1859, in Paris, but Lita fell sick with typhus and died at the Mennecy house of Dr. Pierre Lamire, a friend from Betances' medical school days, on April 22, 1859 (the Good Friday of that year).

Betances was psychologically devastated by Lita's death. Accompanied by his sister, brother-in-law, local friends and a few Puerto Rican friends residing in Paris at the time (which included Basora, Francisco Oller and another Cabo Rojo native, future political leader Salvador Carbonell), Betances had Lita buried on April 25. Her body was later reburied in Mayagüez, on November 13 of that year. Salvador Brau, a historian and close friend, later wrote that once Betances returned to Puerto Rico with Lita's body, he suspended all personal activities besides his medical work, spent a considerable amount of time caring for her tomb at the Mayagüez cemetery, and assumed the physical aspect that most people identify Betances with: dark suit, long unkempt beard, and "Quaker hat."

Betances immersed himself in work, but later found time to write a short story in French, La Vierge de Boriquén (The Boriquén Virgin), inspired in his love for Lita and her later death, and somewhat influenced by Edgar Allan Poe's writing style. Cayetano Coll y Toste later described the story of Lita and Betances in the story La Novia de Betances.

=== Return to Mayagüez and second exile ===
==== Doctor and surgeon ====
After returning to Puerto Rico in 1859, Betances established a very successful surgery and ophthalmology practice in Mayagüez. Even fierce political enemies such as Spanish pro-monarchy journalist José Pérez Morís regarded Betances as the best surgeon in Puerto Rico at the time. His good reputation in Puerto Rico would survive his stay in the island nation for many years. In 1895, while Betances was living in Paris, the manufacturers of the Emulsión de Scott (a codfish liver oil product that is still sold today, manufactured by GlaxoSmithKline in modern times), paid an endorsement fee to Betances to have him appear on advertisements on Spanish language magazines and newspapers all over New York City and the Caribbean, based on his solid reputation as a doctor.

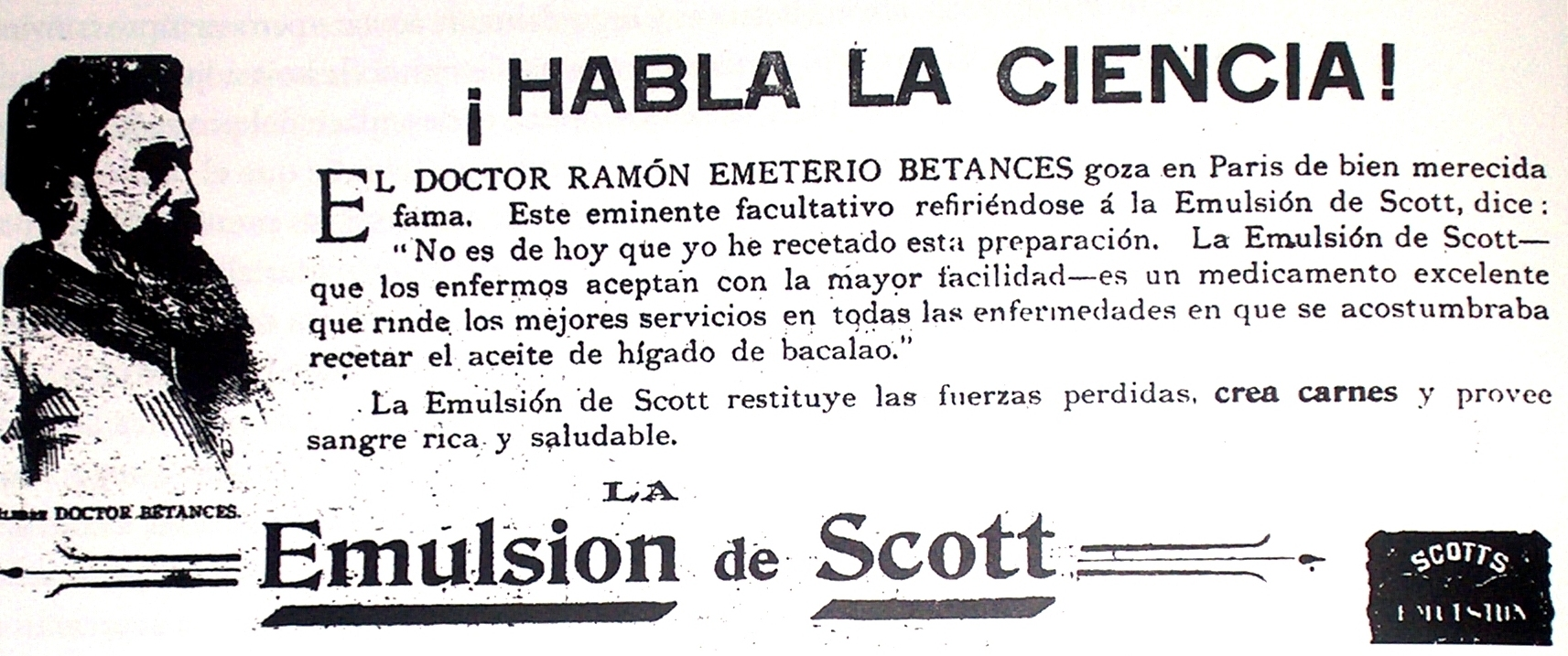
An 1895 newspaper ad that has Betances endorsing Emulsión de Scott

Betances introduced new surgical and aseptic procedures to Puerto Rico. With the assistance of Venezuelan anesthesiologist Pedro Arroyo, Betances performed the first ever surgical procedure under chloroform in Puerto Rico, in November 1862.

At the same time he spent a considerable amount of time serving Mayagüez's disadvantaged on a pro bono basis. He gave many donations to the poor, and because of this he became known as "The Father of the Poor" among "Mayagüezanos" according to his contemporary, Eugenio María de Hostos.

==== Exile in the Dominican Republic ====
The Dominican Republic had its second war for independence in 1844, which was successful in obtaining independence from Haiti. Spain reannexed the country at the request of its then-dictator, Gen. Pedro Santana (who attempted to benefit personally from the event), in 1861. A third revolt, the War of Restoration, sought independence from the Spanish in 1863. Its leaders used Haiti as a guerrilla base, since the Haitian government feared a Spanish takeover and the restoration of slavery in the occupied territories, and was thus sympathetic to their cause. Their stronghold, however, was the Cibao valley in the northeastern part of Hispaniola.

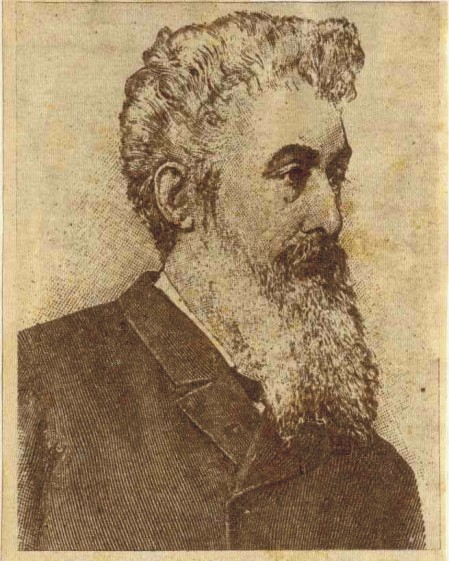
Dr. Ramón Emeterio Betances

At the same time, the Spanish government, which ruled over Puerto Rico, attempted to banish Betances for a second time, but he and Segundo Ruiz Belvis (a lawyer and city administrator who became his closest friend and political companion) fled the island before they were apprehended. Both fled to the northern city of Puerto Plata in the Dominican Republic in 1861, where Betances established a close personal friendship with Gen. Gregorio Luperón, the military leader of the northern pro-independence faction who led the efforts to restore Dominican sovereignty over their country. Betances was also a collaborator of Dominican priest (and later Archbishop of Santo Domingo and one-time president of the country), Fernando Arturo de Meriño, who was the revolt's ideological leader (as well as its delegate in Puerto Rico when he was himself exiled by the restored republican government). These two friendships would prove to be key to Betances' own efforts to achieve Puerto Rican independence later on.

The volatility of the Dominican situation was severe at the time: Luperón fought a guerrilla war against the Spanish and Santana and became vice-president of the country (in 1863), only to be exiled to Saint Thomas because of his opposition to president Buenaventura Báez' wishes to annex the country to the United States (in 1864), to later return, provoke a coup d'état and be part of a three-way presidency (1866), only to be exiled once again (1868). Whenever Luperón was in the Dominican Republic, Betances could use it as a base of operations for his later political and military objectives, while offering Luperón logistical and financial assistance in return.

Since Betances' exile depended on who was governing Puerto Rico at the time, a change in government allowed him to return to Mayagüez in 1862. However, a few years later, (1868) Luperón and Betances would both end up exiled in Saint Thomas.

==== Second return to Mayagüez ====
After returning to Puerto Rico, Betances and Ruiz proposed the establishment of a municipal hospital to take care of the city's poor. The hospital, named Hospital San Antonio, opened on January 18, 1865, with subscription funds and an assignment from the Spanish local government. The Hospital San Antonio is now an obstetrics and pediatrics hospital in the city.

Ruiz was a Freemason who invited Betances to join his lodge, the Logia Unión Germana in nearby San Germán. They both founded (or revived, depending on the source) the Logia Yagüez, so as to have a local lodge in Mayagüez. Based on his Masonic beliefs, Ruiz also attempted to establish a university in the city, for which he mortgaged his house. However, the Spanish government actively discouraged the founding of secondary education institutions in Puerto Rico (so as not to have "seedlings for revolt" come out of them), and the project was canceled.

==== Simplicia Jiménez ====
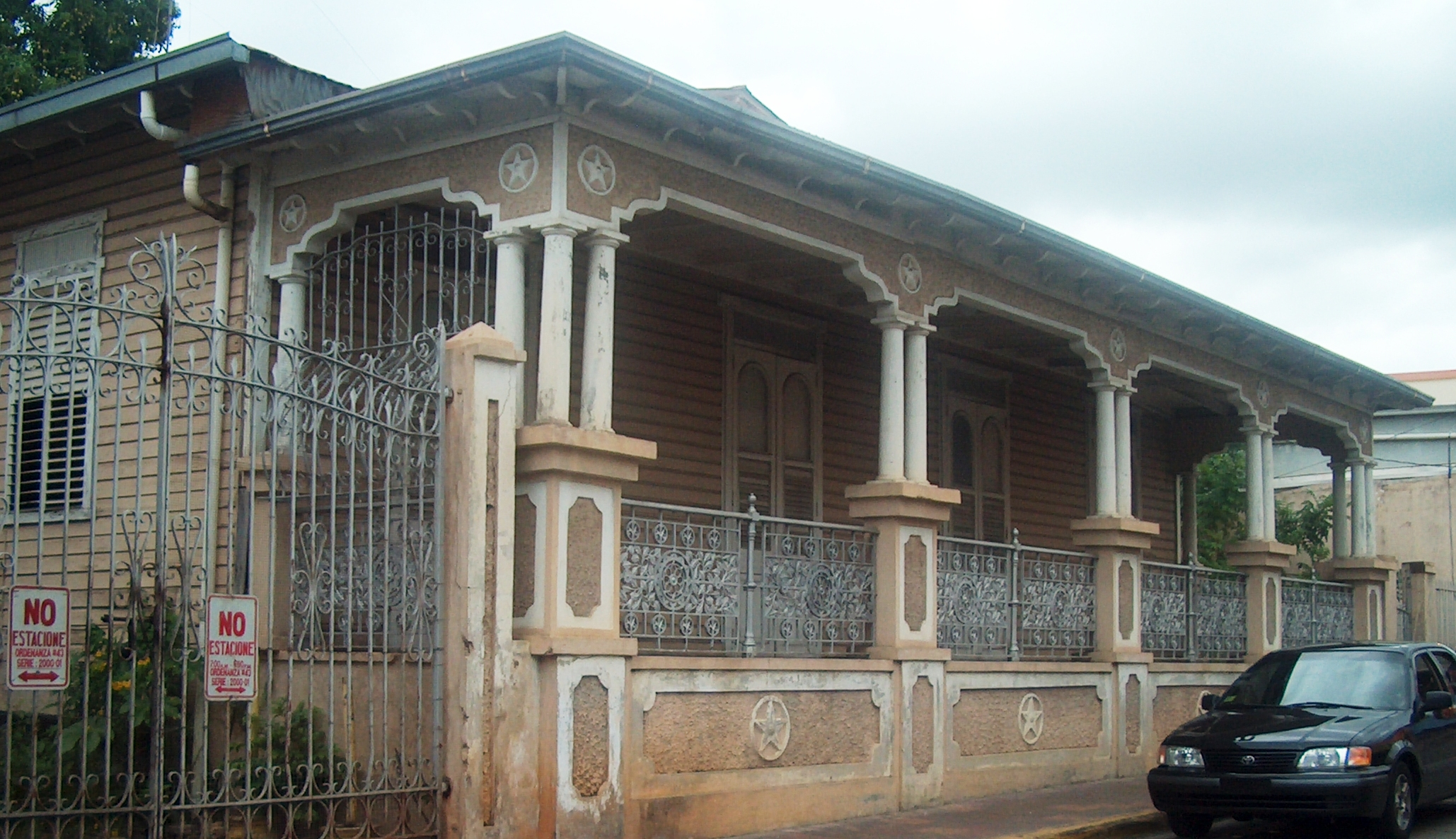
Casa de los Cinco Arcos (Betances' House) in Mayagüez, 2007

Betances met his lifelong companion, Simplicia Isolina Jiménez Carlo, in 1864. Jiménez apparently was born in what would later become the Dominican Republic, on July 28, 1842. Her mother's last name, Carlo, rather common in Cabo Rojo, implies that her family had ties to the town. She worked for one of Betances' sisters between 1863 and 1864, and he met her once at his sister's house. Apparently she was infatuated with him strongly enough to appear at his door with a pair of suitcases, asking him to give her shelter, since "no gentleman would leave a woman alone on the street at night." Jiménez then became Betances' common-law wife for thirty-five years, and survived his death in 1898. They would not have any children. Their godchild, Magdalena Caraguel, was eventually adopted by the couple as their daughter. Little else is documented about Jiménez in history books, and Betances rarely mentions her in his works and correspondence.

While still living in Mayagüez, Betances built a house for himself and his wife, which they only lived in for less than two years; the house, named the Casa de los Cinco Arcos (House of the Five Arches), still stands on the street that bears his name near the corner with Luis Muñoz Rivera street, south of the city's center.

=== "Padre de la Patria" (Father of the Puerto Rican Nation) ===
==== Seeds for revolt in Puerto Rico ====
The Spanish government was involved in several conflicts across Latin America: war with the Dominican Republic, Peru and Chile (see below), slave revolts in Cuba, a bad economic situation in its colonies, among others. It attempted to appease the growing discontent of the citizens of its remaining colonies in the continent by setting up a board of review that would receive complaints from representatives of the colonies and attempt to adjust legislation that affected them. This board, the "Junta Informativa de Reformas de Ultramar" (Overseas Informative Reform Board) would be formed by representatives of each colony, in proportion to their collective population, and would meet in Madrid. The Junta would report to the then Minister of Foreign Affairs, Emilio Castelar.

The Puerto Rican delegation was freely elected by those eligible to vote (male Caucasian property owners), in a rare exercise of political openness in the colony. Segundo Ruiz Belvis was elected to the Junta representing Mayagüez, something that horrified the then governor general of the island. To the frustration of the Puerto Rican delegates, including its leader, José Julián Acosta, the Junta had a majority of Spanish-born delegates, which would vote down almost every measure they suggested. However, Acosta could convince the Junta that abolition could be achieved in Puerto Rico without disrupting the local economy (including its Cuban members, who frowned upon implementing it in Cuba because of its much higher numbers of slave labor). Once he became prime minister in 1870, Castelar did approve an abolition bill, praising the efforts of the Puerto Rico members, sincerely moved by Acosta's arguments.

However, beyond abolition, proposals for autonomy were voted down, as were other petitions to limit the unlimited power the governor general would have upon virtually all aspects of life in Puerto Rico. Once the Junta members returned to Puerto Rico, they met with local community leaders in a famed meeting at the Hacienda El Cacao in Carolina, Puerto Rico, in early 1865. Betances was invited by Ruiz and did attend. After listening to the Junta members' list of voted-down measures, Betances stood up and retorted: "Nadie puede dar lo que no tiene" (No one can give others what they don't have for themselves), a phrase that he would constantly use through the rest of his life when referring to Spain's unwillingness to grant Puerto Rico or Cuba any reforms. He would then suggest setting up a revolt and proclaim independence as soon as possible. Many of the meeting's attendants sided with Betances, to the horror of Acosta.

==== Organizer of the Grito de Lares ====
In late June 1867 Betances and at least 12 more potential "revolutionaries" were exiled from Puerto Rico by then governor Gen. José María Marchessi y Oleaga as a preventive measure, including Goyco and Ruiz. A battalion of local soldiers had revolted in San Juan earlier, protesting about their poor pay, compared to that of their Spanish counterparts living in Puerto Rico. Betances later stated that the revolt (called the "Motín de Artilleros" by historians) was unrelated to his revolutionary plans, and that he actually did not mind the troops stationed in Puerto Rico that much, since they would have been ill-prepared for stopping a well-developed pro-independence revolt at the time anyway. Marchesi feared that the United States, which had made an offer to purchase what were then the Danish Virgin Islands, would rather instigate a revolt in Puerto Rico so as to later annex the island—which would make a better military base in the Caribbean—at a lesser economic cost. His fears were not without base, since the then American consul in the island, Alexander Jourdan, suggested precisely this to then Secretary of State William H. Seward, but only after the expulsions (September 1867).

Some of the expelled (such as Carlos Elías Lacroix and José Celis Aguilera) set up camp in Saint Thomas. Betances and Ruiz, on the other hand, left for New York—where Basora had previously gone—soon after. They soon founded the "Revolutionary Committee of Puerto Rico", along with other Puerto Ricans living in the city. After signing a letter that could serve as proof of his intentions of becoming a United States citizen (mainly to prevent his arrest elsewhere) Betances then returned to the Dominican Republic in September 1867, where he attempted to organize an armed expedition that was to invade Puerto Rico. However, under threat of arrest by Buenaventura Báez—who saw Betances as siding with his enemies and wanted him executed—Betances took asylum at the United States embassy in Santo Domingo, and headed for Charlotte Amalie soon after.

==== The Ten Commandments of Free Men ====
Betances was responsible for numerous proclamations that attempted to arouse Puerto Rican nationalistic sentiment, written between 1861 and his death. The most famous of these is "Los Diez Mandamientos de los hombres libres" (The Ten Commandments of Free Men), written in exile in Saint Thomas in November 1867. It is directly based on the Declaration of the Rights of Man and of the Citizen, adopted by France's National Assembly in 1789, which contained the principles that inspired the French Revolution.

==== The Grito and its aftermath ====
"Puerto Ricans

The government of Mme. Isabella II throws upon us a terrible accusation.

It states that we are bad Spaniards. The government defames us.

We don't want separation, we want peace, the union to Spain; however, it is fair that we also add conditions to the contract. They are rather easy, here they are:

The abolition of slavery

The right to vote on all impositions

Freedom of religion

Freedom of speech

Freedom of the press

Freedom of trade

The right to assembly

Right to bear arms

Inviolability of the citizen

The right to choose our own authorities

These are the Ten Commandments of Free Men.

If Spain feels capable of granting us, and gives us, those rights and liberties, they may then send us a General Captain, a governor... made of straw, that we will burn in effigy come Carnival time, as to remember all the Judases that they have sold us until now.

That way we will be Spanish, and not otherwise.

If not, Puerto Ricans – HAVE PATIENCE!, for I swear that you will be free."

Ten Commandments of Free Men (translated), November 1867

Meanwhile, Ruiz Belvis, who headed the Committee, was supposed to gather financial support for the incoming Puerto Rican revolution through a tour of South America. He had received an invitation from Benjamín Vicuña Mackenna, a Chilean diplomat, to coordinate a common front against Spanish interests in all of Latin America (Spain was still threatening Chile after the Chincha Islands War, and any revolution in the Caribbean would have been a welcome distraction). Vicuña promised to gather necessary support in Chile, Peru, Ecuador and Venezuela to help the Puerto Rican independence cause.

However, Ruiz died in Valparaíso, Chile soon after his arrival in the country. He reportedly had uremia and a urethral obstruction, both of which deteriorated into Fournier gangrene, which killed him soon after. Later speculation that Ruiz had been poisoned or killed has been countered by three facts: that Ruiz's brother, Mariano Ruiz Quiñones (who was the coordinator of the revolution in Curaçao), died of the same condition soon after (suggesting a genetic predisposition to it), that Betances had used a catheter on Ruiz before he left Saint Thomas to bring him some relief from his condition, and that Betances published a medical article in France twenty years later, in 1887, that discussed the condition, out of what he had described as many years of second-guessing what could have been done to save Ruiz's life.

Betances was shaken psychologically by news of Ruiz's death, and by another event soon after; while Betances and his wife were in Saint Thomas on November 18, 1867, they experienced the Virgin Islands earthquake and tsunami. According to a letter he wrote, he and his wife vacated the building just before it collapsed, and were forced to live in a camp while aftershocks kept shaking the island for close to a month.

Gregorio Luperón met Betances in Saint Thomas, and offered to assist the Puerto Rican revolution, in exchange for help to overthrow Báez once the right circumstances were met. As a consequence, Betances organized revolutionary cells in Puerto Rico from exile, which would be led by leaders such as Manuel Rojas and Mathias Brugman. Betances instructed Mariana Bracetti to knit a flag for the revolution using the colors and basic design similar to that of the Dominican Republic (which in turn was almost identical to a French military standard). Betances was also supposed to send reinforcements to the Puerto Rican rebels through the use of a ship purchased by Puerto Rican and Dominican revolutionaries, "El Telégrafo" (which was to be shared by both), but the ship was confiscated soon after arrival by the government of the then Danish (later United States) Virgin Islands.

Eventually all these factors led the way to the abortive insurrection known as the "Grito de Lares", whose date had to be brought forward to September 23, 1868. The Grito found Betances between Curaçao and Saint Thomas, struggling to send reinforcements in time for the revolt.

After the failed insurrection, Betances did not return to Puerto Rico, except for "secret" visits, according to the obituary written about him by the New York Herald after his death. There is no evidence of these, although Betances suggests a visit did occur at some time between 1867 and 1869, and perhaps again in the 1880s.

==== In New York ====
Betances fled to New York City in April 1869, where he again joined Basora in his efforts to organize Puerto Rican revolutionaries into additional activities leading to independence. He joined the Cuban Revolutionary Junta, whose members were more successful at their drive for armed revolution for Cuba, which had started with the "Grito de Yara", just two weeks after the Grito de Lares. He also lobbied the United States Congress successfully against an annexation of the Dominican Republic by the United States, requested in a vote by a majority of voters in a referendum in 1869. He also befriended Venezuelan military leader and former president José Antonio Páez in his final days. Betances stayed in New York from April 1869 through February 1870.

The Antilles now face a moment that they had never faced in history; they now have to decide whether 'to be, or not to be'. (...) Let us unite. Let us build a people, a people of true Freemasons, and we then shall raise a temple over foundations so solid that the forces of the Saxon and Spanish races will not shake it, a temple that we will consecrate to Independence, and in whose frontispiece we will engrave this inscription, as imperishable as the Motherland itself: "The Antilles for the Antilleans"

Speech to the Masonic Lodge of Port-au-Prince,1872

==== In Hispaniola ====
Somewhat disillusioned by his experience in New York City (he had philosophical differences with some leaders of the Antillean liberation movements, particularly with Eugenio María de Hostos), Betances spent a short interlude in Jacmel, Haiti in 1870 at the request of its then-president, Jean Nissage-Saget, who supported Betances' efforts to have a liberal government for the Dominican Republic take power. He later spent some time in the Cibao valley (in both Santiago de los Caballeros and Puerto Plata) where Luperón and Betances attempted to organize another revolt, this time against conservative elements in the Dominican Republic.

While in New York, Betances wrote and translated numerous political treatises, proclamations and works that were published in the newspaper "La Revolución", under the pseudonym "El Antillano" (The Antillean One). He was vehement about the need for natives of the Greater Antilles to unite into an Antillean Confederation, a regional entity that would seek to preserve the sovereignty and well-being of Cuba, Haiti, the Dominican Republic and Puerto Rico.

Betances also promoted direct intervention of Puerto Ricans in the Cuban independence struggle, which eventually happened in the Cuban War of Independence (1895–98). Spain had promoted political reform in Puerto Rico, and the local political climate was not conducive to a second revolution at the time. Therefore, Betances and the Puerto Rican revolutionaries ceded their caches of firearms hidden in Saint Thomas, Curaçao and Haiti to the Cuban rebels in October 1871, since their struggle was deemed as a priority.

Betances admired the United States of America for its ideals of freedom and democracy, but despised Manifest Destiny and the Monroe Doctrine, and sensed that both philosophies were being used as excuses for American interventions on the continent. When Cuban revolutionaries requested help from the United States for reinforcing their armed struggle against Spain, Betances warned them against giving too much away. He feared American interventionism in the affairs of a free Cuba, and vehemently attacked Cuban leaders who suggested the annexation of Cuba by the United States. Some of his fears became reality years later, when the Platt Amendment became a "de facto" part of the Cuban constitution (1901).

== Return to France ==
Expecting to bring some stability to his personal life, Betances had Simplicia Jiménez meet him again in Haiti (she had been living in St. Croix since he was evicted from Saint Thomas, to ensure her safety), and returned with her to Paris where he continued to fight for Puerto Rico's independence for close to 26 years. He established his medical office at 6(bis), Rue de Châteaudun (48.875814°N 2.341636°E), four streets away from the city's Palais Garnier.

One of the events that gave Betances great satisfaction was the abolition of slavery in Puerto Rico, which was made official on March 22, 1873. He reminded people that abolition would not have happened without the direct intervention of Puerto Ricans in the Spanish political process, and was thus hopeful that the islanders would assume a more proactive role in seeking their freedom from Spain. With time, Betances became essentially the representative of the liberal governments of the Dominican Republic for as long as they lasted, and the representative of the Cuban "government in arms", or insurrection.

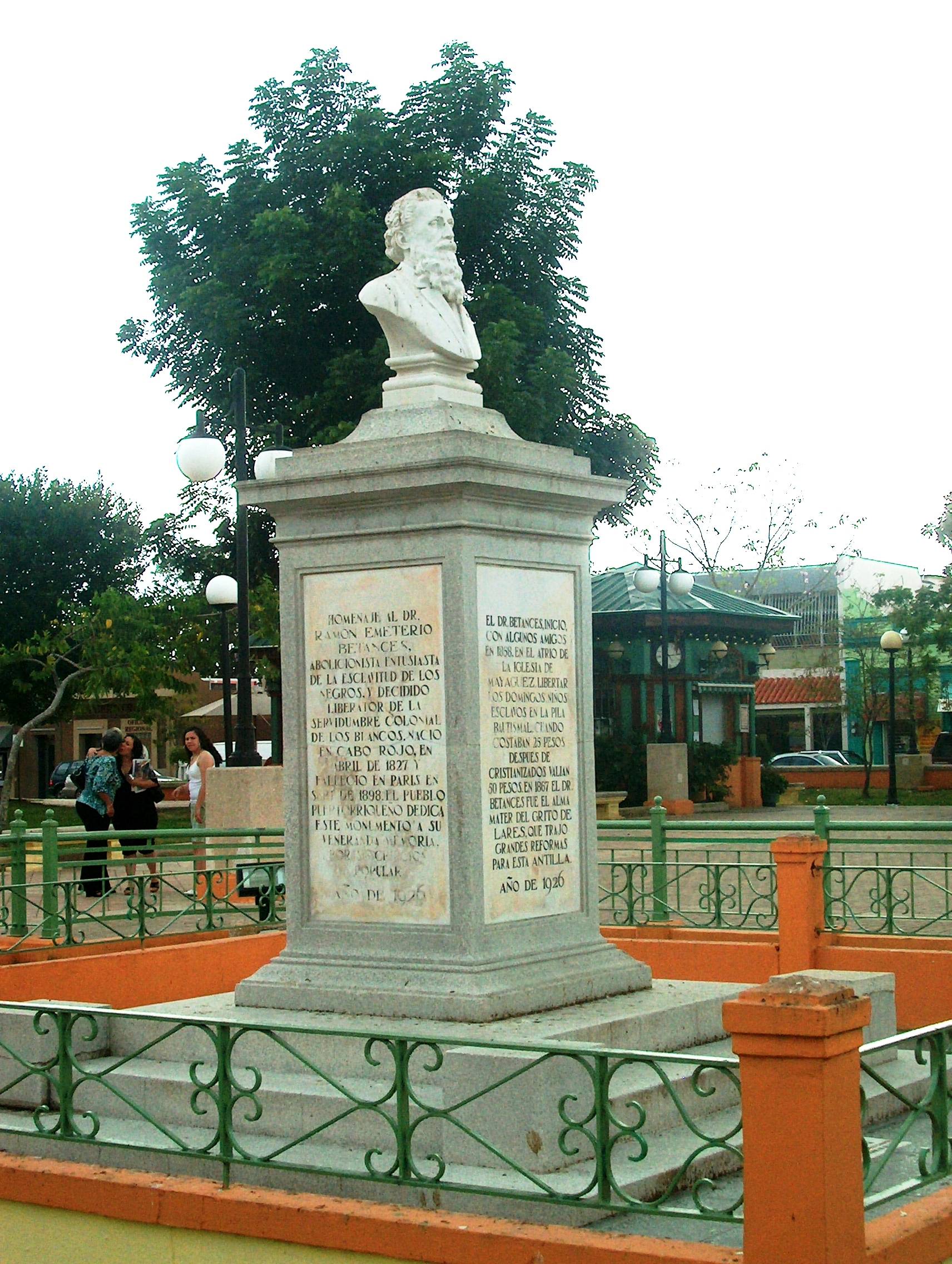
Monument to Dr. Betances in Cabo Rojo, 2007. The monument includes inscriptions honoring him on behalf of the Dominican Republic and Cuba.

=== Diplomatic and revolutionary activities ===
==== Diplomat for the Dominican Republic ====
Soon after his return to France, Betances became the first secretary to the Dominican Republic's diplomatic mission to France, but virtually assumed the role of ambassador. He also became the commercial representative of the Dominican government in Paris, Bern and London. At one time Betances attempted to be a venture capital partner on a failed enterprise that attempted to commercialize the use of Samaná Bay to benefit the Dominican Republic, and also to prevent foreign interests (particularly the United States) from taking over the bay, which was considered a primary strategic geographical feature of Hispaniola, in both commercial and military terms.

Luperón would eventually arrive in Paris as a named ambassador, but Betances' connections in the city proved to be key to whatever success Luperón had as a diplomat in France. They would assume this role until political turmoil in the Dominican Republic forced Luperón to return and lead yet another revolt, which had another Puerto Plata native, Ulises Heureaux, installed as president. Betances sought support for Luperón's efforts, and gave him tactical and financial assistance from France.

Heureaux, however, became a despot once he assumed the presidency. Luperón felt betrayed and went again into exile in Saint Thomas. Eventually he died of cancer, not before visiting Betances in France for a last time and being allowed to return to the Dominican Republic to die, as a gesture of good will from Heureaux. Due to Heureaux's protracted presidency and blatant acts of corruption, Betances (who had called Heureaux his "grandson" in letters he had previously written to him) was forced to cut ties to the Dominican Republic for good (two plots of land that he owned both there and in Panama were used for agricultural experiments, but were later left unattended). Betances writes in his letters that he had spent the equivalent of US$20,000 (in 1880 dollars, roughly equivalent to US$400,000 in 2010) on expenditures on behalf of the Dominican diplomatic office. He did not expect the Dominican government to be able to reimburse him.

==== Support for Cuba's independence and José Maceo's freedom ====
Immediately after returning to Paris, Betances became a key contact for the Cuban insurgency in Paris. He made several fund raising efforts, including one that attempted to fund quinine shipments to the Cuban rebels, to ease their pain when infected by malaria in the island battlefields. These efforts outlasted the Pact of Zanjón, which ended the Ten Years' War in 1878. Betances also used his diplomatic contacts to guarantee humane treatment (and eventually freedom from imprisonment) to José Maceo, the brother of Antonio Maceo, the later military leader of the Cuban War of Independence, when both Antonio and José were arrested by the Spanish government in 1882. The Maceo brothers both escaped imprisonment, were recaptured in Gibraltar and turned over to the Spanish authorities, but José remained in jail long after Antonio regained his liberty and fled to New York City. Betances even used Lord Gladstone as a mediator, and attempted to convince him of having Jamaica (where his family had properties) join an Antillean Federation.

==== Betances and Máximo Gómez ====
When Puerto Rico experienced a period of severe political repression in 1887 by the Spanish governor of the time, Romualdo Palacio (which led to the arrest of many local political leaders, including Román Baldorioty de Castro), Máximo Gómez, who was living in Panama at the time (at the time, he supervised a laborers' brigade during the construction of the Panama Canal) offered his services to Betances, sold most of his personal belongings to finance a revolt in Puerto Rico, and volunteered to lead any Puerto Rican troops had such revolt occur. The revolt was deemed unnecessary later in the year, when the Spanish government recalled Palacio from office to investigate charges of abuse of power from his part, but Gómez and Betances established a friendship and logistical relationship that lasted until Betances' death in 1898.

==== Betances and José Martí ====
Years later, due to Betances' experience as a logistics facilitator of armed revolts, a fund raiser for the Cuban independence cause, and as a diplomat, José Martí asked Betances to become the leader of Cuban revolutionaries in France. Betances never met Martí personally, but Martí did know Betances' younger sister, Eduviges, who lived in New York City and shared her brother's revolutionary ideals. Martí assisted her financially in her final days, out of admiration for the Betances' family. Betances accepted the assignment out of gratitude towards Martí. Soon after, Martí died in battle in Cuba in 1895, an event that brought Tomás Estrada Palma to the leadership of the Cuban insurrection movement.

==== Betances and Tomás Estrada Palma ====
In April 1896 Betances was granted diplomatic credentials on behalf of the revolutionary government of Cuba. He became an active fund raiser and recruiter on behalf of the Cuban pro-independence movement. He also served as press officer and intelligence contact for the Cuban rebels in exile, and attempted to coordinate support for the pro-independence movement in the Philippines.

Betances openly hated Estrada when he first met him in the late 1870s, but grew more tolerant of him with time, and even defended Estrada's actions as leader when he assumed control of the Cuban Revolutionary Party. The Puerto Rican affiliates to the Party viewed Estrada's leadership with great skepticism, since Estrada sympathized with the idea of having the United States intervene in the Cuban independence war to have the Spanish evicted from Cuba. They suspected that his weak leadership allowed opportunists to profit from an invasion and even suggest that the United States keep Puerto Rico in exchange for independence for Cuba. Some written evidence points to the truth of their affirmations, at least to the extent of wanting to have the Puerto Rican section of the Cuban Revolutionary Party shut down, which eventually did happen.

==== The Intentona de Yauco ====
In 1897, Antonio Mattei Lluveras, a wealthy coffee plantation owner from Yauco, visited the Puerto Rican Revolutionary Committee in New York City. There he met with Ramón Emeterio Betances, Juan de Mata Terreforte and Aurelio Méndez Martínez and together they proceeded to plan a major coup. The uprising, which became known as the Intentona de Yauco was to be directed by Betances, organized by Aurelio Mendez Mercado and the armed forces were to be commanded by General Juan Ríus Rivera. The coup, which was the second and last major revolt against Spanish rule in Puerto Rico failed.

Betances was also a government representative for some of the governments of Haiti while in Paris. He was also technically a diplomat for the United States of America once.

==== Morales Plan ====
Through coordination with Betances and local pro-independence leaders in Puerto Rico, a Dominican military leader, Gen. José Morales, made plans to invade Puerto Rico in the late 1890s, to supply local revolutionaries with supplies and mercenaries, and take advantage of the weak Spanish military presence in Puerto Rico (there were only 4,500 Spanish soldiers in the island at the time, and 1,000 of them were later redirected to Cuba to fight the Cuban insurrection). However, the Cuban Revolutionary Party rejected the plan as being too expensive.

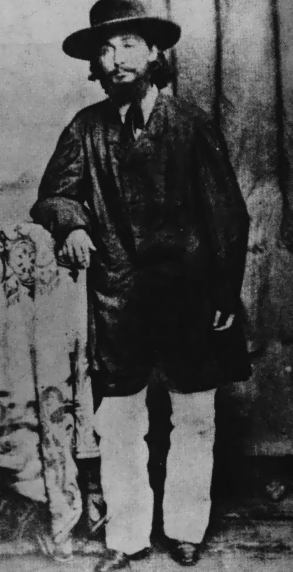
Betances at age 40

Betances, who had collected more money in France for the Party than the plan's potential cost, grew weary of the Cuban revolutionary movement's diminishing support of the Puerto Rico independence cause. By then, some of the Party's followers stationed in France wanted Betances to be stripped of his posts and assignments. At least two of them insulted him publicly, and even took advantage of Simplicia Jiménez's mental health to have her harass her husband systematically.

Given the events happening in Cuba at the time, Betances thought that his diplomatic work was more important than ever. However, his failing health (he had uremia, and since his lungs could not exchange oxygen properly this put extra burden to his heart and kidneys) prevented Betances from performing further diplomatic work from France on behalf of Puerto Rico or Cuba. His illness, which lasted more than a year, prevented him from performing medical work, and forced the Party to approve a stipend for Betances during his long illness, until his death.

=== The Cánovas Affair ===
There is some speculation that the assassination of Spanish prime minister Antonio Cánovas del Castillo by Italian anarchist Michele Angiolillo in 1897 was at least supported or influenced by Betances, and possibly even planned by him (although there is no physical link that can be established that might link Betances to the event itself).

Betances' role in the Cánovas assassination is described by Puerto Rican (born in France) author Luis Bonafoux in his biography about Betances (written in 1901), and partially corroborated by later historians. These sources establish that Betances' circle of friends at the time included various Italian anarchists exiled in Paris, Domenico Tosti being one of them. Tosti and his friends would hold regular social events, during one of which Angiolillo was introduced to Betances.

Impressed by Betances' credentials, Angiolillo later approached Betances before the incident, and discussed his plans with him, which originally implied killing one or more young members of the Spanish royal family. Betances then dissuaded him from doing this. Angiolillo then apparently suggested Cánovas as a target instead. There is evidence that Betances financed Angiolillo's travel to Spain, and used his contacts to have Angiolillo reach and enter Spanish territory under a false identity. Further speculation that Angiolillo used a firearm that Betances himself furnished for him appears to be unfounded (although Betances, who was a fan of firearms himself —he taught a Cuban revolutionary leader on how to use a Remington machine gun once— gave at least one as a gift to one of his acquaintances).

Betances sympathized with anarchists like Angiolillo, and hated monarchists like Cánovas, but this alone would not justify direct action from Betances into taking Cánovas' life. Betances did state at the time, however, that "in Spain there is only one true retrograde and reactionary leader, and he is precisely the one who confronts Cuba with a policy of '(spending in a war up to) the very last man and the very last peseta,' the one who tries to suffocate all efforts that her patriots do to free her, and that man is Antonio Cánovas del Castillo."

Angiolillo, in true solidarity with the European anarchist current, sought to avenge the execution and/or torture of those implicated in a bombing against a Roman Catholic religious procession in Barcelona, which occurred in 1896, and for which Cánovas sought the maximum penalties allowed by law.

The truth is that Puerto Rican liberal interests benefited directly from the Cánovas assassination, since by Cánovas' death a pact made (previous to the event) between the new Spanish prime minister, Práxedes Mateo Sagasta, and Puerto Rican liberals headed by Luis Muñoz Rivera would come into effect soon after. It allowed the establishment of a new autonomy charter for the island territory, which gave Puerto Rico broader political powers than at any other time before or since.

Before his execution, Angiolillo claimed sole responsibility for the assassination. When asked about his involvement in the Cánovas affair, Betances said: "No aplaudimos pero tampoco lloramos" ("We don't applaud it, but we don't cry over it, either"), and added: "Los revolucionarios verdaderos hacen lo que deben hacer" ("True revolutionaries do what they ought to do"). Betances' ambiguous response blurs the true level of his involvement in the Cánovas assassination.

=== Legion of Honor award ===
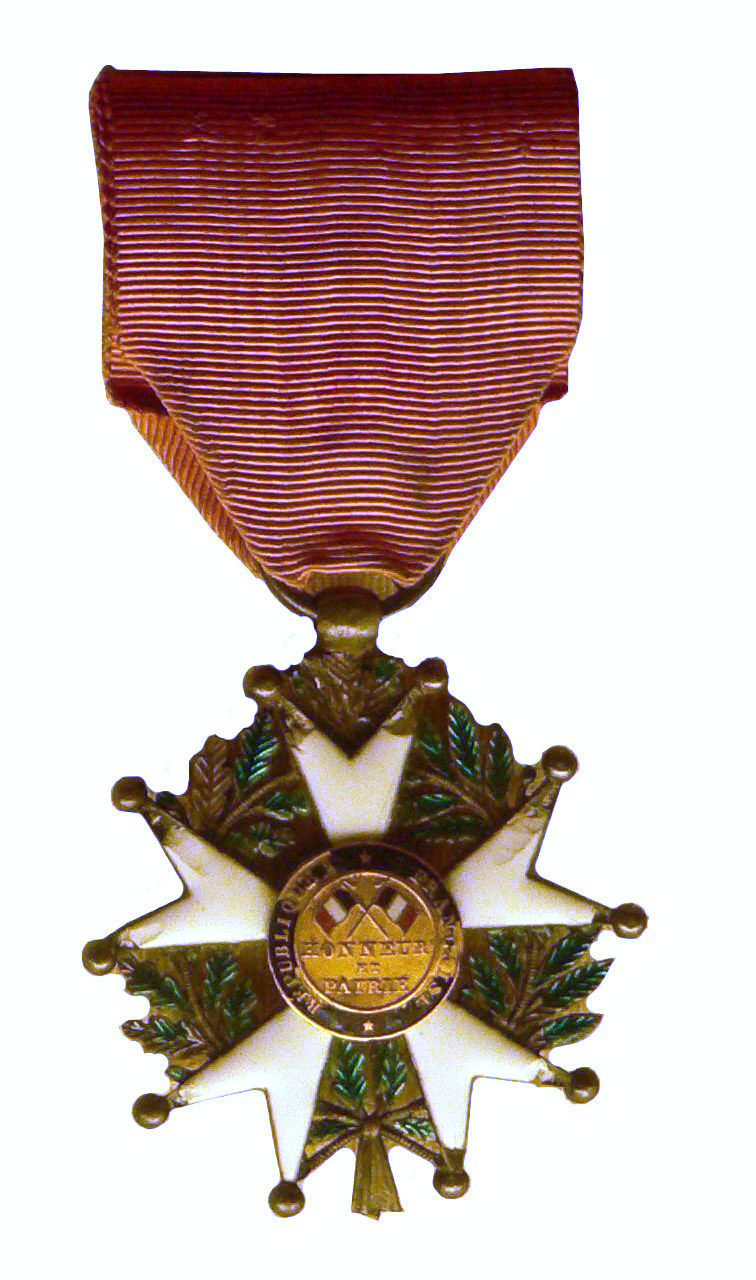
French Legion of Honor

Betances was awarded the rank of Chévalier (Knight) of the Legion of Honor by the French government in July 1887, for his work as a diplomat for the Dominican Republic, and for his work as a medical doctor in France. He had been offered the award as early as 1882, but had repeatedly declined the honor out of humility, until friends from Puerto Rico persuaded him to accept it as a tribute to Puerto Rico, and not as a personal award. The French Legion of Honor (Légion d'honneur) is the premier order of France, and its award is one of great distinction.

=== Efforts to counter the U.S. annexation of Puerto Rico ===
In 1898 Betances attempted to use his diplomatic contacts to impede a Puerto Rico annexation by the United States, which was deemed imminent by the events following the sinking of the USS Maine. He knew that Puerto Ricans would welcome an American invasion, but was vehement about the possibility of the United States not conceding independence to Puerto Rico.

Betances was willing to accept some political concessions to the North American government in exchange for independence, and exchanged some privileged intelligence information (about the level of debt Spain had attained while fighting the Cuban insurrection) with the then-ambassador of the United States to France, Horace Porter, so as to show goodwill towards the United States.

Frustrated by what he perceived as the unwillingness of Puerto Ricans to demand their independence from the United States while the island territory was annexed (the event occurred just days before his death), he uttered his final political stance: "No quiero colonia, ni con España, ni con los Estados Unidos" ("I don't want a colony status, neither with Spain nor with the United States"). When reminded by de Hostos through a letter of what was happening in the island, he responded, highly frustrated, with a phrase that has become famous since: "¿Y qué les pasa a los puertorriqueños que no se rebelan?" ("And what's wrong with Puerto Ricans that they haven't yet rebelled?")

Betances' last days were chaotic, not only because of the events in the Caribbean, but also because of what happening in his own household. Jiménez' mental state is reported as dubious by then. Some even suggest that she had become an alcoholic (probably) or even a morphine addict (unlikely) by then, and she even wished for her husband to die in tantrums reported by his doctors. Political foes attempted to gain possession of Betances' intelligence dossiers, as did Spanish intelligence agents in Paris. Betances asked personal friends to keep personal guard of him, which they did until he died.

== Death ==
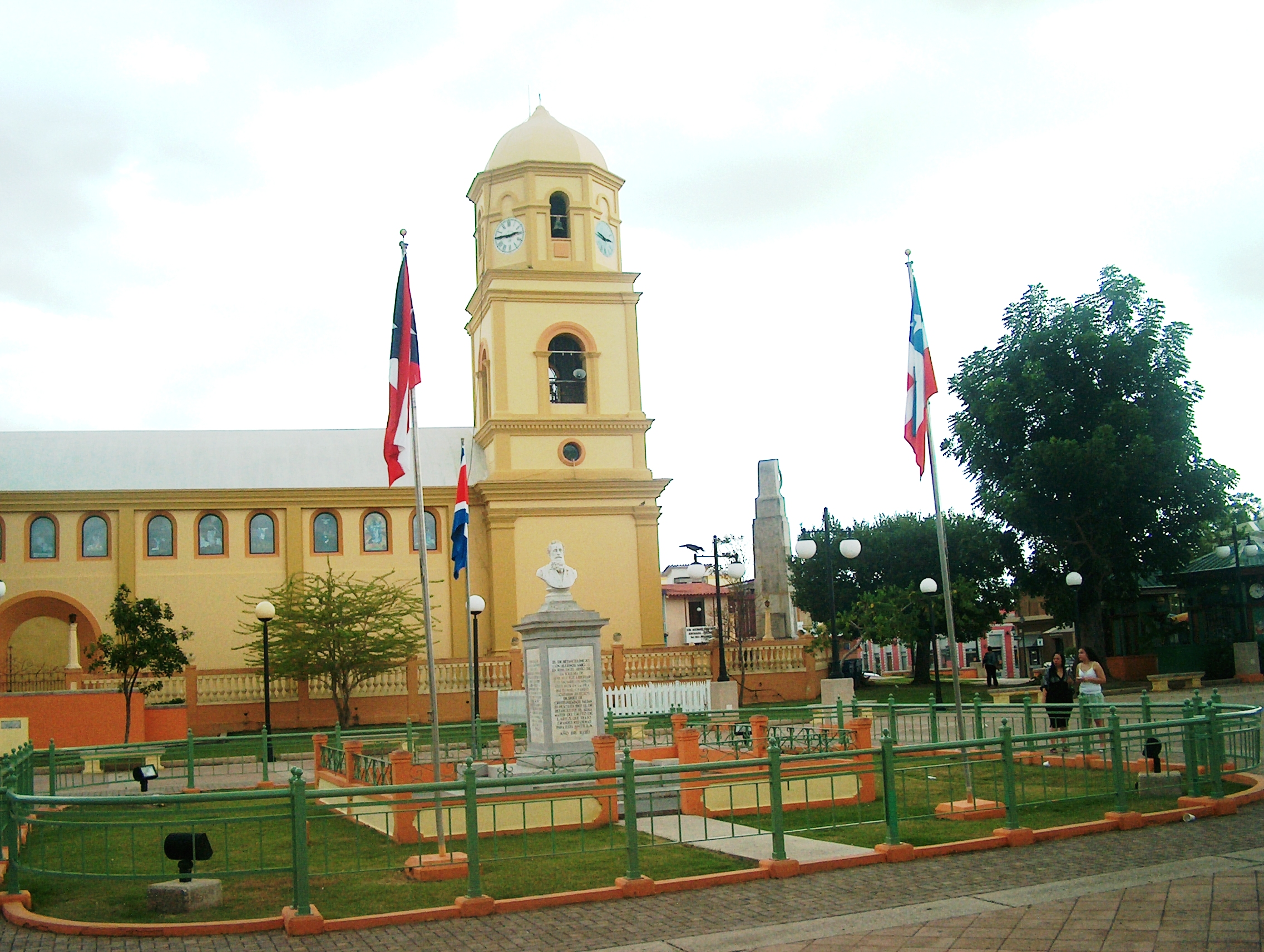
Tomb of Dr. Betances next to San Miguel Arcángel Church, 2007

Betances died at 10:00 a.m., local time, in Neuilly-sur-Seine on Friday, September 16, 1898. His remains were cremated soon after and entombed at the Père Lachaise Cemetery of Paris on Monday, September 19. He had requested that no formal ceremony be made for his funeral. His common law-wife Simplicia survived him for over 20 years. A look at his will implies that, besides a life insurance policy payout and two parcels of land in the Dominican Republic, Betances died almost in poverty.

As early as in February 1913, poet and lawyer Luis Lloréns Torres had publicly requested that Betances' wishes to have his ashes returned to Puerto Rico be fulfilled. The Nationalist Association (predecessor of the Puerto Rican Nationalist Party), under the presidency of José Coll y Cuchí, was able to convince the Puerto Rican Legislative Assembly to approve an act that would allow the transfer of the mortal remains of Puerto Rican patriot Ramón Emeterio Betances from Paris, France, to Puerto Rico. Seven years after the act's approval, the Legislative Assembly commissioned one of its delegates, Alfonso Lastra Charriez, to serve as an emissary and bring Betances' remains from France.

Betances' remains arrived in San Juan, Puerto Rico, on August 5, 1920, and were honored upon arrival by a crowd then estimated at 20,000 mourners. The large crowd, which had assembled near the port of San Juan as early as 4:00 a.m. (AST) that morning, was the largest ever assembled for a funeral in Puerto Rico since the death of Luis Muñoz Rivera three years earlier. Media reporters of the day were surprised by the size of the crowd, given the fact that Betances had not visited Puerto Rico (at least in the open) for the 31 years before his death, and had been dead over 21 years afterwards.

A funeral caravan organized by the Nationalist Party transferred the remains from the capital to the town of Cabo Rojo. It took the caravan two days to make the 120-mile (193 km) route. Once Betances' remains reached the city of Mayagüez, 8,000 mourners paid their respects. Betances' remains were laid to rest in Cabo Rojo's municipal cemetery. A few decades later his remains were moved to a monument designed to honor Betances in the town's plaza. There is a bust created by the Italian sculptor Diego Montano alongside the Grito de Lares revolutionary flag and the Puerto Rican flag in the plaza, which is also named after Betances.

A marble plaque commemorating Betances was unveiled at his Paris house by a delegation of Puerto Rican, Cuban and French historians on the 100th. anniversary of his death, on September 16, 1998.

== Legacy ==
According to Puerto Ricans and French historians in three different fields (medicine, literature and politics), Betances left a legacy that has been considerably understated, and is only being assessed properly in recent times.

=== Complete works ===
Betances' two primary biographers, Paul Estrade and Félix Ojeda Reyes, have announced the publication of a compilation of Betances' complete works, comprising 14 volumes. José Carvajal is the collection's editor. The first two volumes were formally published in Mayagüez on April 8, 2008. The first volume features most of Betances' written works about medicine; the second features intimate letters and document excerpts Betances wrote to family and friends over a span of 39 years. A third volume, which compiles some of Betances' literary works, was published in 2009.

The Voz del Centro Foundation in Puerto Rico released a series of youth-oriented books named "Voces de la Cultura – Edición Juvenil" that same year; its first title being "Doctor Ramón Emeterio Betances: Luchador por la libertad y los pobres" ("Doctor R. E. Betances, Fighter for Liberty and the Poor").

=== Landmarks ===
==== In the United States ====
There is an elementary school in Hartford, Connecticut, named in honor of Betances and Hartford's Puerto Rican community.

There is a plaza and mural in the south end of Boston, Massachusetts, named in honor of Betances.

==== In Puerto Rico ====
As mentioned above, the main thoroughfare that crosses Mayagüez from north to south is named after Betances. In Ponce there is a thoroughfare linking downtown Ponce and Puerto Rico highway 14, PR-14, which is named "Avenida Betances".

=== Political and sociological ===
==== In Puerto Rico ====
Those who have judged our Lares revolution with disdain are not aware of the dangers that the movement cost, or what was really done then, or the results obtained since, or the sorrows, the pains, the deaths, the mourning that followed. They are not aware of the sufferings of those who were outlawed, or the recognition that they deserve. But the world is full of ingratitudes, and the disdainful tend to forget that this revolutionary act is precisely the highest struggle of dignity that has been done in Puerto Rico in four centuries of the most opprobrious servitude, engraving in its flag the abolition of slavery and the independence of the island.

I'd rather not remember so much pain, so many efforts to illustrate those who pretend to disavow that great redemptive work. But this was the pride of the people, of the entire Puerto Rican people, of everyone who conspired for it and suffered for the future Motherland and the liberty of today.

May the holy day of revolution for the Spanish Antilles come, and I will die satisfied!

Article written in the Cuban revolutionary monthly Patria, August 25, 1894

The political and sociological consequences of Betances' actions are definite and unequivocal. He was the first openly nationalistic political leader in Puerto Rico, and one of the first pro-independence leaders in the island nation's history (Among Puerto Ricans, Antonio Valero de Bernabé and Andrés Vizcarrondo—earlier pro-independence leaders for the Latin American revolutions—could not achieve the success Betances had years later within Puerto Rico). The Grito de Lares, using an often-quoted phrase that dates from 1868, "was the birth of Puerto Rican nationality, with Betances as its obstetrician". Nationalistic expressions in Puerto Rico—be they public affirmations, newspaper articles, poems, town meetings or outright revolts—were almost nonexistent before the 1810s election of Ramón Power y Giralt to the Spanish Cortes, most of them were defined within the framework of loyalty to Spain as a metropolitan power (and thus subordinate to Spanish rule over Puerto Rico), and many of them were quickly suppressed by the Spanish government, which feared an escalation of nationalistic sentiment that, in other countries, led to the independence movements of Latin America.

Although the seeds of both proactive government repression against the Puerto Rican independence movement had been planted before the Grito de Lares, and its aftermath only guaranteed the surge of autonomism as a political alternative in the island, the level of cultural and social development of a collective Puerto Rican conscience was almost a direct consequence of the event.

Betances is considered a pioneer of Puerto Rican liberalism. His ideas resulted from his exposure to republicanism and social activism in France through the middle part of the 19th. century. These ideas, considered subversive in the severely restricted Puerto Rico of the era, had nevertheless a considerable impact in the island nation's political and social history. His ideas on race relations alone had a major impact on economics and the social makeup of the island.

==== In the Greater Antilles ====
Political events in Puerto Rico and Cuba between the late 1860s and 1898 forced a liberalization of Spanish policy towards both territories, and Betances was directly involved as a protagonist in both circumstances. As a firm believer in "Antillanismo" (the common improvement and unity of the countries that formed the Greater Antilles) Betances was also a strong supporter of the sovereignty of the Dominican Republic and Haiti. A Dominican historian and political leader, Manuel Rodríguez Objío, likened Betances' revolutionary work to that performed by Tadeusz Kościuszko for Poland, Lithuania and the United States of America. Paul Estrade, Betances' French biographer, likens him to Simón Bolívar, Antonio José de Sucre, Bernardo O'Higgins and José de San Martín.

José Martí considered Betances one of his "teachers", or sources of political inspiration, and his diplomatic and intelligence work in France on behalf of the Cuban revolutionary junta greatly aided the cause, before it was directly influenced by the intervention of Gen. Valeriano Weyler as governor and commander of the Spanish forces in Cuba, and by the Maine incident later on.

Paul Estrade, Betances' French biographer, assesses his legacy as an Antillean this way: "The Antilles have developed political, social and scientific ideas that have changed the world, and that Europe has used. Not everything has (a European) source. Betances is the maximum expression of this reality."

=== Medical ===
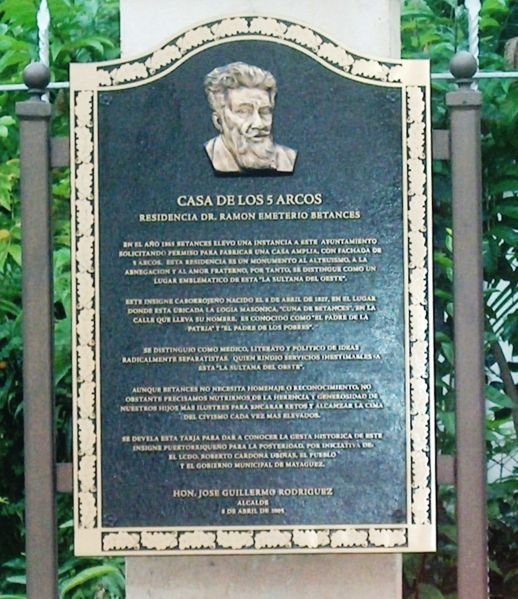
Plaque honoring Betances in front of his Mayagüez house, 2007

Betances wrote two books and various medical treatises while living in France. His doctoral thesis, "Des Causes de l'ávortement" (The Causes for Miscarriage) examines various possible causes for the spontaneous death of a fetus and/or its mother, was later used as a textbook on gynecology at some European universities. According to at least one medical practitioner who examined it in 1988, his attempt to explain the theory behind spontaneous contractions leading to childbirth were not very different from modern-day theories on the matter.

Betances' experiences handling the Mayagüez cholera epidemic led to another book, "El Cólera: Historia, Medidas Profilácticas, Síntomas y Tratamiento" (Cholera: History, Preventive Measures, Symptoms and Treatments), which he authored and published in Paris in 1884 and expanded in 1890. The book was later used as a public health textbook in dealing with similar cholera epidemics in Latin America.

Betances also wrote several medical articles while in France. One of the articles examines elephantiasis; another deals with surgical castration, called "oscheotomy" at the time. Both books were also based on personal experience: there is evidence about a surgery he performed in Mayagüez on a Spanish government official with an elephantiasis lesion of the scrotum the size of a grapefruit for which the costs were paid for by the local government; another patient he operated upon had a lesion that weighed 26 lb (12 kg) He also wrote an article on urethral obstructions in male patients (see above).

=== Literary ===
Betances was also one of the first Puerto Rican "writers-in-exile". In 1851, a small group of Puerto Rican university students in Europe formed the "Sociedad Recolectora de Documentos Históricos de la Isla de San Juan Bautista de Puerto Rico", a society that attempted to research and catalog historical documents about Puerto Rico from firsthand government sources. Betances became the Society's researcher in France. The result of the Society's research was published in an 1854 book, for which Betances contributed. Inspired by Alejandro Tapia y Rivera, the Society's organizer, who had written a novel inspired in Puerto Rican indigenous themes while studying in Madrid, Betances writes his novel: "Les Deux Indiens: Épisode de la conquéte de Borinquen" (The Two Indians: an episode of the conquest of Borinquen), and publishes it in Toulouse in 1853, with a second edition published in 1857 under the pseudonym "Louis Raymond". This novel would be the first of many literary works by Betances (most of which were written in French), and is notable for its indirect praise of Puerto Rican nationhood which, he suggests, was already developed in pre-Columbian Puerto Rico. This type of "indigenist literature" would become commonplace in Latin America in later years. He also wrote poetry in both French and Spanish for literary magazines in Paris, chiefly inspired by Alphonse de Lamartine and Victor Hugo.

== Major works ==
- Toussaint Louverture, Les Deux Indiéns (1852)
- Un premio de Luis XIV (1853)
- Las cortesanas en París (1853)
- La Vierge de Borinquén (1859)
- La botijuela (a.k.a. Aulularia, translation from the Latin original by Plautus, 1863)
- El Partido Liberal, su progreso y porvenir (translation from the French original by Édouard René de Laboulaye, 1869)
- Washington Haitiano (essay about Alexandre Pétion, 1871)
- Los viajes de Scaldado (1890)

Betances also wrote one of the two prologues of the book "Les détracteurs de la race noire et de la République d'Haiti" (The detractors of the black race and the Republic of Haiti, 1882)

== See also ==
- List of Puerto Ricans
- List of revolutions and rebellions
- Revolutionary wave
