= Luis Lloréns Torres =

Puerto Rican poet, playwright, and politician

- Luis Lloréns Torres
- Born: May 14, 1876; Collores, Juana Díaz, Puerto Rico
- Died: June 16, 1944 (aged 68); Santurce, Puerto Rico
- Education: University of Granada
- Occupations: poet, playwright, politician
- Writing career
- Pen name: Luis de Puertorrico

Luis Lloréns Torres (May 14, 1876 – June 16, 1944), was a Puerto Rican poet, playwright, and politician. He was an advocate for the independence of Puerto Rico.

== Early years ==
Llorens Torres was born in Juana Diaz, Puerto Rico. His parents, Luis Aurelio del Carmen Llorens and Marcelina Soledad de Torres, were the wealthy owners of a coffee plantation. In Collores (a barrio of Juana Diaz), Llorens Torres was always in contact with nature, which accounts for the love that he felt for nature and country. He always stated that he was proud to come from Collores barrio. His poem El Valle de Collores made the barrio one of the most well-known of the island of Puerto Rico. His Catalan grandfather, Josep de Llorens i Robles, immigrated from Figueres, province of Girona, Spain.

Llorens Torres went to school in Mayagüez and Maricao. He went to Spain after he finished his secondary studies on the island and studied at the University of Barcelona where he began his studies. He then proceeded to study Philosophy and Letters at the University of Granada where he obtained both a Doctorate degree and a law degree. In Spain he published his first book of poetic verses "Al Pie de la Alhambra", which was dedicated to the woman who would eventually become his wife, Carmen Rivero.

== Political career ==
Llorens Torres returned to Puerto Rico in 1901, married, and moved to Ponce where he established his own law firm (Nemesio Canales later joined his firm) and collaborated with the newspaper Lienzos del Solar. During this time he wrote some of his best works. He also met numerous poets like Julia de Burgos.

When Llorens Torres returned to Puerto Rico he found a political situation completely different from the one that he had left. Puerto Rico had been invaded by the United States during the Puerto Rico Campaign of the Spanish–American War in 1898. This motivated Llorens Torres to join the political Union Party of Puerto Rico. The ideal of independence for the island. He transmitted his beliefs to the public through his poem "El Patito Feo" (The Ugly Duckling). He became a member of the Puerto Rican legislature and was named to the Camara of Delegates from 1908 to 1910 representing the municipality of Ponce. On February 8, 1912, together with Rosendo Matienzo Cintrón and Manuel Zeno Gandía, he wrote a manifesto which stated that it was time for Puerto Rico to have its independence. That year Llorens Torres, Rosendo Matienzo Cintrón, Manuel Zeno Gandía, Eugenio Benítez Castaño, and Pedro Franceschi founded the Independence party which was the first party in the history of the island to exclusively want Puerto Rican independence. Eugenio Benítez Castaño was named president of the short lived political party. In 1913, Llorens Torres co-founded with Nemesio Canales La Revista de Las Antillas..., a literary publication.

== Grito de Lares ==
Llorens Torres' historical drama, El Grito de Lares (The Cry of Lares), deals with the attempted overthrow of the Spanish government on the island with the intention of establishing the island as a sovereign republic. In the book, he describes the flag of the revolt created by Mariana Bracetti. The flag was divided in the middle by a white cross, the two lower corners were red and the two upper corners were blue. A white star was placed in the upper left blue corner. According to Llorens Torres, the white cross on the Grito de Lares flag stands for the yearning for homeland redemption, the red squares, the blood poured by the heroes of the rebellion, and the white star in the blue solitude square, stands for liberty and freedom.

== Works ==
Among his works are décimas and poems:

- Al pie de la Alambra, 1899 poem
- La Revista de las Antillas, newspaper founded in 1913
- Juan Bobo, magazine
- Idearium, magazine
- Valle de Collores, (Collores) 1940 décima / poem
- Canción de las Antillas, (Song of the Antilles) 1913 poem
- Sonetos Sinfónicos, 1914 book
- Distant Song, 1926 poem
- Rapsodia Criolla, (Creole Life), 1935 poem

== Death ==
Llorens Torres died in Santurce, a barrio of San Juan, Puerto Rico. He defended the ideal of Puerto Rican independence until the day he died and was buried at the Puerto Rico Memorial Cemetery in Carolina, Puerto Rico.

== Legacy ==
The Government of Puerto Rico has honored the memory of Luis Llorens Torres by naming a public housing project (Residencial Luis Lloréns Torres) in Santurce after him. Among the other things that were named after him are an avenue in San Juan, a high school in Juana Diaz, and a children's academy in New York City. There is a bust of him in front of the high school named after him and there is a statue of Luis Llorens Torres, sculpted by the Puerto Rican sculptor Tomás Batista, in the "Plazita Famosa" of Juana Diaz.

== See also ==
- List of Puerto Rican writers
- List of Puerto Ricans
- Puerto Rican literature
