= Antillean Confederation =

Proposed political union in the Spanish Caribbean

Antillean Confederation Confederación Antillana
- The flag used during the Grito de Lares uprising was later associated with the proposed confederation
- Motto: Las Antillas para los antillanos ("The Antilles for the Antilleans")
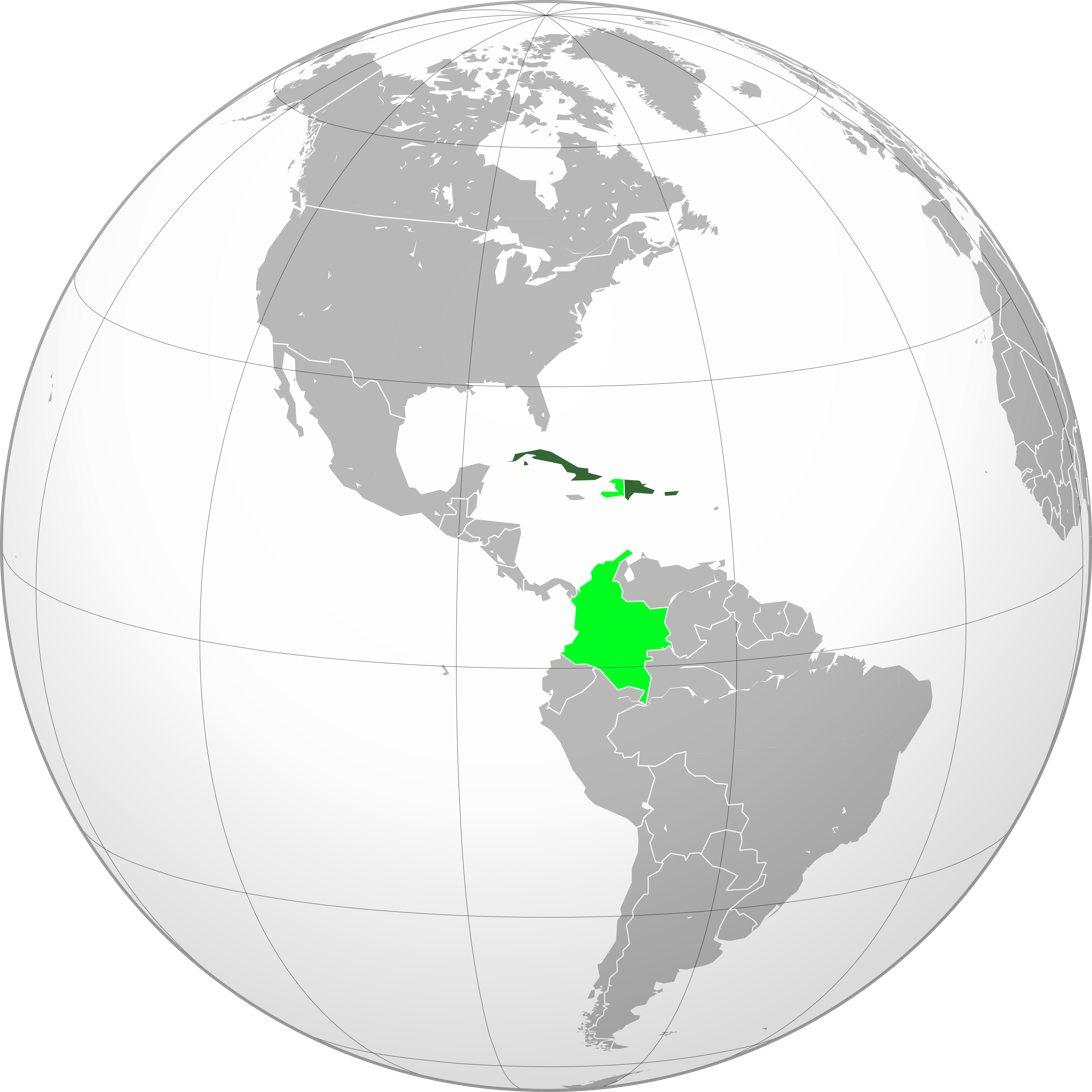
- Orthographic projection of the hypothetical Antillean Confederation. Original proposed members in dark green and additional proposed members in light green.
- Official languages: Spanish
- Demonym: Antillean
- Type: Proposed confederation
- Proposed constituent countries: Cuba; Dominican Republic; Puerto Rico
- Establishment: 11 April 1868 (proposed)

Area
  - Total: 167,659 km^{2} (64,734 sq mi)
- Today part of: Cuba; Dominican Republic; Puerto Rico

The Antillean Confederation, first proposed April 11, 1868, was the proposed idea of Ramón Emeterio Betances about the need for peoples of the Spanish-speaking Greater Antilles in the Caribbean to unite in a political confederation in order to preserve the sovereignty and interests of Cuba, Dominican Republic, and Puerto Rico. Supporters of the idea wanted to free the Spanish island possessions of Cuba and Puerto Rico, later uniting them with the Dominican Republic in Hispaniola, creating a political union in the Spanish Caribbean.

The idea was supported by many of the generals who fought in wars such as the Dominican War of Independence, the Dominican Restoration War, the Ten Years' War, the Little War, the Cuban War of Independence, and the Grito de Lares (Cry of Lares) revolt in Puerto Rico. Support was strongest from the 1860s up until the Spanish–American War, which transferred the possessions of Cuba and Puerto Rico from Spain to the United States, since then the support for the idea largely faded away.

Its main aim was to subsequently end European colonialism in the Americas as well as a response to the Monroe Doctrine phrase America for the Americans, which Betances changed to Antilles for the Antilleans. The main gathering point of the idealists was San Felipe de Puerto Plata, Dominican Republic.

Later, In the 1900s, a prominent Puerto Rican politician and political writer by the name of José de Diego heavily based his idea of The Antillean Union on the ideals that were present in the original failed Antillean Confederation

Strong supporters of this idea:

- Eugenio María de Hostos, also known as The Citizen of the Americas
- Gregorio Luperón, hero of the Dominican Restoration War
- José Martí, often referred to as The Apostle of Cuban Independence
- José de Diego, also known as The Father of the Puerto Rican Independence Movement
- Ramón Emeterio Betances, also known as The Father of the Puerto Rican Homeland
- Anténor Firmin

== See also ==
- Spanish Caribbean
- History of Puerto Rico
- History of Dominican Republic
- History of Cuba
- Latin American integration
- Patria Grande
