= Partido Revolucionario Cubano (1892) =

Cuban Revolutionary Party Partido Revolucionario Cubano
- Historic leaders: José Martí; Tomás Estrada Palma
- Founded: 10 April 1892
- Dissolved: 23 December 1898
- Succeeded by: Cuban Revolutionary Party – Authentic (not legal successor)
- Headquarters: New York, United States
- Ideology: Liberalism; Radicalism; Cuban nationalism Anti-imperialism
- Political position: Centre

Party flag

The Cuban Revolutionary Party (Spanish: Partido Revolucionario Cubano, PRC) was a political organization created by the Cuban intellectual José Martí on 10 April 1892 in order to organize the independence of Cuba and, as much as possible, Puerto Rico, the last two overseas provinces of Spain in America.

== Conception and creation ==
José Martí advocated tirelessly to make the “hour of the second independence” come to pass and thereby prevent the expansion of the United States on the lands of Latin America. In its continental strategy, the liberation of Cuba and Puerto Rico was a first step that would decide the fate of the continent. Martí, from 1891 on, would dedicate all his energies to creating an institution of a new type, structuring a strong and solid revolutionary unit, unique in the history of Latin America: The Cuban Revolutionary Party, a party for independence. At the end of 1891, Martí had expressed in conversations and speeches to the Cuban exiles, the idea of creating a group that would organize and serve as an ideal vehicle for the preparation of a future revolution.

Martí conceived Cuba's national liberation on the ideological basis of the most radical, democratic, and egalitarian strain of liberalism at the time, with the desire to introduce a regime that would guarantee racial and gender equality and civil liberties for all. The party also maintained ties with radical Puerto Rican liberals such as Ramón Emeterio Betances.

On January 3, 1892, at the San Carlos Club in Cayo Hueso (Key West), José Martí made known to José Francisco Lamadrid, José Dolores Poyo Estenoz and Colonel Fernando Figueredo Socarrás, his idea of founding the Cuban Revolutionary Party (PRC), also known as the Cuban-Puerto Rican Revolutionary Party. As of January 4, 1892, a process of study and approval of the Secret Bases and Statutes began by the emigration from Key West, Tampa and New York. Each existing group in the emigration, or each group of Cubans who wanted to form a Club, analyzed the document, suggested what they deemed appropriate, and once they were approved, the acceptance was communicated to the supreme body in New York.

== See also ==
- Manifesto of Montecristi
