= Timeline of San Juan, Puerto Rico =

Coordinates: 18.45°N 66.066667°W

The following is a timeline of the history of the municipality of San Juan, Puerto Rico.

== 16th–18th centuries ==
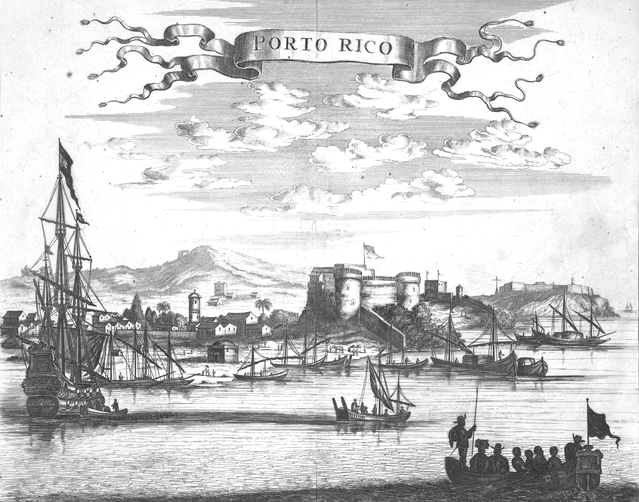
Porto Rico, 17th century

- 1511 – August 8: First Catholic Diocese in the Americas established in San Juan.
- 1513
  - Construction of a wooden cathedral in the Islet of San Juan begins.
  - Escuela de gramática established by bishop Alonso Manso.
- 1521
  - August 15: Ciudad de San Juan Bautista de Puerto Rico officially founded by Spanish colonists after abandoning nearby Caparra.
  - Construction of Casa Blanca for the Ponce de León family begins.
  - Platting and construction of several streets in Old San Juan including Plaza de Armas and Plaza de la Catedral.
- 1523 – Convento de Santo Tomas de Aquino founded.
- 1524 – Nuestra Señora de la Concepción Hospital built.
- 1526 – October 4: St. Francis Hurricane occurs.
- 1528 – San José Church construction begins.
- 1529 – October 18: Harbor attack by Caribs.
- 1530
  - August 5: Hurricane occurs.
  - Casa Blanca built.
- 1533 – Construction of La Fortaleza begins by orders from King Charles I of Spain.
- 1540 – La Fortaleza built.
- 1542 – Cathedral of San Juan Bautista construction begins.
- 1560 – City wall construction begins.
- 1560s – San Antonio Bridge built across Condado Lagoon.
- 1568
  - September 7: Hurricane occurs.
  - Fortín San Antonio is built to protect the eastern entrance to the San Juan Islet.
- 1580 – San Juan becomes the capital of the Captaincy General of Puerto Rico.
- 1582 – Population: 850 (approximate estimate).
- 1591 – Castillo San Felipe del Morro construction begins.
- 1594 – Witch-hunt, the first of its kind in the Americas, occurs in what is now Puerta de Tierra by orders of bishop and inquisitor Don Nicolás Ramos.
- 1595 – November 22: Battle of San Juan begins.
- 1598 – June: San Juan taken by British forces; Boquerón battery sacked.
- 1605 – Cabildo constructed in Plaza de San Juan.
- 1615 – September 12: Hurricane occurs.
- 1625 – September 24: Town besieged by Dutch forces.
- 1651 – Monasterio del Señor San José de la Orden de nuestra Señora del Carmen founded by Doña Ana Lanzós.
- 1733 – Palacio Episcopal construction begins (approximate date).
- 1750 – establishment of the first advance defense line on the eastern end of the San Juan Islet.
- 1756 – Church of Saint Francis of Assisi established by the Third Order of Franciscans.
- 1760 – Santurce founded as San Mateo de Cangrejos.
- 1769 – San Gerónimo Powderhouse built.
- 1770 – Miraflores Powderhouse built.
- 1780 – Capilla del Santo Cristo de la Salud built.
- 1783 – Castillo de San Cristóbal built.
- 1787
  - May 2: 1787 Boricua earthquake causes considerable damage to the city fortifications.
  - May 3: Fiesta de Cruz begins.
- 1791 – Fortín de San Gerónimo is built.
- 1797 – April: San Juan besieged by British forces.
- 1800 – construction of the Arsenal de San Juan begins.

== 19th century ==
- 1806 – Gaceta de Puerto Rico newspaper begins publication.
- 1810 – Construction of a Camino Real between San Juan and Río Piedras (today the Ponce de León Avenue).
- 1813 – Sociedad Económica de Amigos del País en Puerto Rico founded.
- 1820 – Population: 7,658.
- 1822 – Board of charity established.
- 1823 – Sociedad Filarmónica (philharmonic society) formed.
- 1832
  - Church of San Mateo de Cangrejos of Santurce built.
  - Real Audiencia de Puerto Rico established.
  - Teatro Municipal (theatre) opens.
- 1840 – Colegio de Abogados founded.
- 1845 – Town divided into barrios San Francisco, San Juan, Santa Barbara, Santo Domingo, and Ballajá.
- 1846 – Castillo San Felipe del Morro lighthouse is built.
- 1847 – San Juan Waterworks established in Río Piedras.
- 1848 – Cafe de La Mallorquina in business.
- 1850 – Real Intendencia Building constructed.
- 1853
  - Cataño-San Juan steamship begins operating.
  - Marketplace built in Santa Barbara barrio.
- 1854 – Paseo de la Princesa established.
- 1858 – Telegraph service is established in San Juan and Santurce.
- 1859 – Barrios De la Marina and Puerta de Tierra become part of San Juan.
- 1863
  - Santurce becomes part of San Juan.
  - Santa María Magdalena de Pazzis Cemetery established.
- 1864 – Ballajá Barracks built.
- 1865 – Colegio de Párvulos built.
- 1867 – November 18: a 7.5 earthquake heavily damages portions of the city wall, prompting the demolition of its southeastern portion afterwards.
- 1873 – March 22: Slavery officially abolished in Puerto Rico.
- 1876 – April 30: Ateneo Puertorriqueño (cultural entity) founded.
- 1877 – Cárcel de la Princesa (prison) built.
- 1878 – steam tramway service established between San Juan and Río Piedras.
- 1879 – José Ramón Becerra y de Gárate becomes mayor.
- 1882 – Ponce de León statue erected in the Plaza de San José.
- 1883 – Auxilio Mutuo Hospital established.
- 1884 – October: González Padín, the first department store in Puerto Rico, opens its first store in San Juan.
- 1885 – Civil Hospital built.
- 1888 – La Carbonera barrio becomes part of San Juan.
- 1893
  - October 5: Sociedad Anónima de Economías y Préstamos (later Banco Popular de Puerto Rico) founded.
  - Christopher Columbus statue erected in the Plaza Colón at the site of the former Puerta de Tierra city gate.
  - Electric street lighting established.
- 1894 – Population: 23,414.
- 1897 – Phone infrastructure established.
- 1898
  - May 12: Bombardment of San Juan by United States forces.
  - June 22: Second Battle of San Juan.
  - June 28: Third Battle of San Juan.
  - August 12: End of hostilities between US and Spanish military forces. United States Military Government begins.
  - October: Francisco del Valle becomes mayor.
  - Carretera Central (Ponce-San Juan Road) built.
  - San Juan News begins publication.
  - Railway built (approximate date).
- 1899
  - March 12: Mission of St. John the Baptist, the first Episcopal mission in Puerto Rico, is established.
  - April 11: Town becomes part of United States-annexed Puerto Rico per Treaty of Paris.
  - Chamber of commerce founded.
  - Population: 32,048.
- 1900
  - May 1: Foraker Act comes into force, civil government for Puerto Rico begins. United States Military Government ends.
  - Supreme Court of Puerto Rico and Puerto Rico Department of Education headquartered in San Juan.
  - Insane asylum established.
  - Modern La Perla settlement begins (approximate date).

== 20th century ==
=== 1900s–1950s ===
- 1901
  - Trolley de San Juan begins operating.
  - San Juan High School opens.
- 1902 – City government formed into legislative and executive branches.
- 1903
  - March 12: University of Puerto Rico established in Rio Piedras as Escuela Normal.
  - Barriada Miranda, the first official public residential area, is built in Puerta de Tierra.
  - Roberto H. Todd Wells becomes mayor.
- 1904 – Camp Las Casas established by the US Army.
- 1907 – José Julián Acosta School, the first public elementary school, is built in Puerta de Tierra.
- 1909 – Harbor enlarged.
- 1910
  - March 6: Puerto Rico Ilustrado begins publication.
  - Dos Hermanos Bridge opens.
  - First Lutheran and Methodist churches in San Juan open in Puerta de Tierra.
  - Santurce marketplace is established.
  - Tres Banderas Theater opens, the first of many theaters to be established in an area known as Broadway of Puerto Rico during the 1910s and 1920s.
  - Population: 48,716.
- 1913 – Cine Luna opens.
- 1914 – Jose V. Toledo Federal Building and United States Courthouse is built.
- 1915
  - March 25: the first shot of World War I fired against the Central Powers by the regular armed forces of the United States is shot by Lieutenant Teófilo Marxuach in the San Juan Bay.
  - December 8: Church, school and convent of San Agustín are officially opened.
  - Carnegie Library, the first purpose-built library in Puerto Rico, is built.
- 1917 – July 24: Antiguo Casino de Puerto Rico is officially inaugurated.
- 1918 – October 11: 1918 San Fermín earthquake.
- 1919
  - October 16: Condado Vanderbilt Hotel in business.
  - San Juan Asamblea Municipal (municipal assembly) and Concejo de Administración (administrative council) created.
- 1920 – Population: 70,707.
- 1921 – September 21: Academia del Perpetuo Socorro founded.
- 1922 – December 3: WKAQ radio begins broadcasting.
- 1923
  - U.S. military Fort Buchanan established.
  - Mansion Georgetti (residence) built.
- 1925
  - Academia San Jorge founded.
  - Loaiza Cordero Institute for Blind Children, the first of its kind in Puerto Rico, is founded.
- 1926 – School of Tropical Medicine established by Bailey Ashford.
- 1928
  - September: San Felipe Segundo Hurricane occurs.
  - Luis Muñoz Rivera Park laid out.
  - Workers protest at Puerta de Tierra and its docks.
- 1929
  - January 1: Women's suffrage begins in Puerto Rico.
  - February 11: Capitol of Puerto Rico building constructed.
- 1930
  - February: Episcopal Cathedral of St. John the Baptist is built.
  - Population: 114,715.
- 1931 – San Juan Custom House built.
- 1932 – September–October: San Ciprian hurricane.
- 1934 – Luis Muñoz Rivera Park opens to the public.
- 1935
  - May 28: Puerto Rico Reconstruction Administration headquartered in San Juan.
  - November 12: Estadio Sixto Escobar opened.
  - Universidad del Sagrado Corazón is established.
- 1937 – Puerta de Tierra Tenement Group Project A, today known as El Falansterio de Puerta de Tierra, is built.
- 1939 – Martín Peña Bridge built.
- 1940
  - United States Naval Air Station Isla Grande (Isla Grande Airport) established.
  - Population: 169,247.
- 1942 – October 10: Normandie Hotel opens.
- 1943
  - March 3: Fort Brooke is established by the US Army.
  - July 28: 1943 Puerto Rico earthquake.
- 1945 – January 2: Roberto Sánchez Vilella becomes Mayor of San Juan.
- 1946 – January 2: Felisa Rincón de Gautier becomes Mayor of San Juan.
- 1947 – WAPA, WIAC, WITA, and WRSJ radio begin broadcasting.
- 1948 – City flag design adopted.
- 1949
  - February 4: San Juan National Historic Site established by the National Park Service.
  - December 9: Caribe Hilton Hotel built.
- 1950
  - October 30: San Juan Nationalist revolt.
  - Residencial Las Casas housing complex built.
  - Population: 224,767.
- 1951
  - July 1: Río Piedras becomes part of San Juan municipality.
  - Museum of History, Anthropology and Art of the University of Puerto Rico, the first purpose-built museum in Puerto Rico, officially opens.
- 1952 – City officially becomes capital of newly created Commonwealth of Puerto Rico.
- 1953
  - San Juan Cruise Port officially established.
  - Sha'are Zedeck, the first synagogue in Puerto Rico, opens in Santurce.
- 1954
  - May: WAPA-TV and WKAQ-TV (television) begin broadcasting.
  - Ballets de San Juan founded.
- 1955
  - June: Institute of Puerto Rican Culture and Archivo General de Puerto Rico headquartered in city.
  - Luis Muñoz Marín International Airport opens.
- 1956 – Casals Festival of classical music begins.
- 1958
  - December: La Concha Resort opens.
  - Supreme Court Building officially inaugurated by U.S. Supreme Court chief justice Earl Warren.
  - Casa del Libro established.
- 1959
  - May 11: Puerto Rico Metropolitan Bus Authority established.
  - June: U.S. National Governors Association meets in San Juan.
  - The San Juan Star English-language newspaper begins publication.

=== 1960s–1990s ===
- 1960
  - Office of Secretario de la Asamblea Municipal (secretary of the municipal assembly) created.
  - Conservatory of Music of Puerto Rico opens in the former Colegio de las Madres del Sagrado Corazón.
  - Roman Catholic Archdiocese of San Juan de Puerto Rico formed.
  - Cataño Ferry regular service is established by the Puerto Rico Ports Authority.
  - Population: 451,658.
- 1962
  - January 27: Hotel El Convento is opened on the former Carmelite monastery.
  - Hiram Bithorn Stadium is opened.
- 1963 – October 4: Puerto Rico Sheraton Hotel (today the San Juan Marriott Resort & Stellaris Casino) opens.
- 1965 – Hato Rey central business district (Milla de Oro) established with the construction of gubernamental and financial high-rises such as Banco Popular headquarters.
- 1966
  - July: 1966 Central American and Caribbean Games held.
  - September: Polytechnic University of Puerto Rico and San Juan Children's Choir established.
  - Albizu University established by Carlos Albizu Miranda at the former psychiatric asylum.
  - University of Puerto Rico, Medical Sciences Campus founded.
- 1967 – August 24: El Monte Mall, the first climate controlled indoor mall in Puerto Rico, opens.
- 1968
  - February 28: Center for Advanced Studies on Puerto Rico and the Caribbean founded by Pablo Casals, Luis Muñoz Marín, Roberto Busó Carrasquillo and Jaime Benítez.
  - September 12: Plaza Las Américas shopping mall in business.
- 1969 – January 2: Carlos Romero Barceló becomes Mayor of San Juan.
- 1970
  - January: San Sebastián Street Festival established.
  - Population: 452,749.
- 1971 – March 10: San Juan Botanical Garden inaugurated.
- 1973
  - February 1: Roberto Clemente Coliseum opened.
  - April 11: Puerto Rico National Library headquartered in city.
- 1974 – April: Association of Caribbean Historians organized during meeting in San Juan.
- 1976 – June: 2nd G7 summit held in Dorado near city.
- 1977
  - January 12: Hernán Padilla becomes Mayor of San Juan.
  - San Juan Police Department is officially established.
- 1979 – July: 1979 Pan American Games held.
- 1981
  - April 9: Centro de Bellas Artes (opera house) opens.
  - First mosque in Puerto Rico is established in Río Piedras.
- 1983 – December: La Fortaleza and San Juan National Historic Site designated an UNESCO World Heritage Site.
- 1984
  - October 4: Puerto Rico Museum of Contemporary Art established.
  - October 12: Pope John Paul II pastoral visit to San juan.
- 1985 – January 2: Baltasar Corrada del Río becomes Mayor of San Juan.
- 1986
  - June: U.S. Conference of Mayors held in San Juan.
  - December 31: Dupont Plaza Hotel arson.
  - San Juan Philharmonic Chorale formed.
- 1988 – Archivo Histórico Arquidiocesano de San Juan (historical archives) established.
- 1989
  - January 2: Héctor Luis Acevedo becomes Mayor of San Juan.
  - September 18: Hurricane Hugo.
  - Sociedad Puertorriqueña de Genealogía headquartered in San Juan.
- 1991 – Autonomous Municipalities Act of 1991 created.
- 1992
  - Plaza del Quinto Centenario built to commemorate the 500th anniversary of the European discovery and Spanish conquest of Puerto Rico and the Americas.
  - Museo de Las Américas established in the former Ballajá Barracks.
- 1994 – Teodoro Moscoso Bridge opens.
- 1997 – January 2: Sila María Calderón becomes Mayor of San Juan.
- 1998 – Nuevo Milenio State Forest is proclaimed to protect the last remaining karst hills from urban sprawl in San Juan.
- 2000
  - June 30: Museo de Arte de Puerto Rico established at the former civil hospital.
  - August 3: San Patricio State Forest proclaimed.

== 21st century ==
- 2001 – January 2: Jorge Santini becomes Mayor of San Juan.
- 2004
  - September 4: José Miguel Agrelot Coliseum opened.
  - September 15: Hurricane Jeanne occurs.
  - December 17: Tren Urbano, the first rapid transit system of the Caribbean, begins operating.
- 2005 – the Puerto Rico Convention Center is officially opened.
- 2006 – December 15: San Juan Natatorium is opened.
- 2008 – September: Hurricane Kyle occurs.
- 2009 – May: Economic protest.
- 2010
  - December 24: largest earthquake to directly impact the San Juan metropolitan area since 1975.
  - Population: 395,326.
- 2011 – 2010–2011 University of Puerto Rico strikes
- 2012 – November 6: Territorial Puerto Rican status referendum, 2012 held.
- 2013 – January 14: Carmen Yulín Cruz becomes Mayor of San Juan.
- 2017 – September 20: Hurricane Maria occurs and is covered extensively by CBS journalist David Begnaud
- 2019 – July 8 - August 12: Protests throughout San Juan in response to Telegramgate
- 2020 – March 13: first case of COVID-19 in Puerto Rico reported in San Juan
- 2021 – January 11: Miguel Romero becomes Mayor of San Juan.
- 2023 – January 15: San Juan Puerto Rico Temple, the third LDS temple of the Caribbean and first in Puerto Rico, is officially dedicated.

== See also ==
- San Juan history
- List of mayors of San Juan, Puerto Rico
- List of bishops of San Juan, since 1511
- Subdivisions of San Juan, Puerto Rico
- National Register of Historic Places listings in metropolitan San Juan, Puerto Rico
- Timelines of other municipalities in Puerto Rico: municipalities in Puerto Rico: Bayamón, Hormigueros (in Spanish), Mayagüez, Ponce

== Bibliography ==
=== Published in 17th–19th centuries ===
in English

- Antonio de Alcedo; G.A. Thompson (1812), "Puerto Rico", Geographical and Historical Dictionary of America and the West Indies [Diccionario geográfico-historico de las Indias Occidentales o América], London: Printed for James Carpenter, "Puerto Rico, the capital"
- Jedidiah Morse; Richard C. Morse (1823), "Porto Rico", A New Universal Gazetteer (4th ed.), New Haven: S. Converse
- William Drysdale (January 18, 1891). "In Porto Rico's Capital". New York Times.
- M. de Magalhães (1898). "San Juan". Colonial Business Directory of the Island of Puerto Rico. New York. OCLC 39940968.
- Frederick A. Ober (1899), "San Juan, the Capital", Puerto Rico and its Resources, New York: D. Appleton and Co.
- Robert Thomas Hill (1899), "Cities of Porto Rico: (San Juan)", Cuba and Porto Rico (2nd ed.), New York: Century Company

in Spanish

- Antonio de Alcedo (1788), "Puertorico", Diccionario geográfico-historico de las Indias Occidentales o América (in Spanish), Madrid: Manuel Gonzalez
- Íñigo Abbad y Lasierra (1866), Historia geográfica, civil y natural de la Isla de San Juan Bautista de Puerto Rico [Geographic, civil and natural history of the island of Saint John the Baptist of Puerto Rico] (in Spanish), Puerto-Rico: Imp. y Librería de Acosta, OCLC 82511773, OL 20590535M
- Waldo Jiménez de la Romera (1887), "La capital", Cuba, Puerto-Rico y Filipinas (in Spanish), Barcelona: Daniel Cortezo y C.ª, OCLC 3153821
- Rafael del Castillo, ed. (1891), "San Juan de Puerto Rico", Gran Diccionario geográfico, estadístico e histórico de España y sus provincias (in Spanish), vol. 3, Barcelona: Henrich y Compañía en Comandita
- "San Juan de Puerto Rico". Diccionario enciclopédico hispano-americano de literatura, ciencias y artes (in Spanish). Vol. 18. Barcelona: Montaner y Simon. 1896. hdl:2027/mdp.35112203983350.

in other languages

- Joannes de Laet (1625), "St. Juan de Porto Rico", Nieuwe wereldt, ofte, Beschrijvinghe van West-Indien [New World, Description of the West Indies] (in Dutch), Tot Leyden: Isaack Elzevier
- Arnoldus Montanus (1671). "Porto Rico". De Nieuwe en Onbekende Weereld [The New and Unknown World: or Description of America and the Southland]. Antwerp: J. Meurs.

=== Published in 20th century ===
in English

- A.P.C. Griffin; Library of Congress (1901). List of Books (with References to Periodicals) on Porto Rico. Washington DC: U.S. Government Printing Office. (Includes bibliographic information relevant to San Juan, p. 53+ etc.)
- "Porto Rico: San Juan". Official Commercial Directory of Cuba, Porto Rico and the Entire West Indies, with Bermuda. New York: Spanish-American Directories Company. 1901. pp. 340+.
- Charles Hartzell, ed. (1903), "Sketches of Cities, Towns, and Villages: San Juan", Register of Porto Rico for 1903, San Juan: Louis E. Tuzo and Co., pp. 200+
- "Porto Rico: San Juan Bautista", United States, with Excursions to Mexico, Cuba, Porto Rico, and Alaska (4th ed.), Leipzig: K. Baedeker, 1909, pp. 669+, OCLC 02338437
- "San Juan". Commercial Guide and Business Directory of Porto Rico. New York: F.E. Platt. 1910. pp. 17–66.
- "San Juan Bautista de Puerto Rico" . Encyclopædia Britannica. Vol. 24 (11th ed.). 1910. p. 151.
- A. Hyatt Verrill (1914), "San Juan", Porto Rico past and present and San Domingo of today, New York: Dodd, Mead
- Ernst B. Filsinger (1922), "San Juan", Commercial Travelers' Guide to Latin America, Washington, DC: Govt. Print. Office
- Federal Writers' Project (1940), "San Juan", Puerto Rico: a Guide to the Island of Boriquén, American Guide Series, New York: University Society, pp. 171–232, hdl:2027/mdp.39015030579083, OCLC 245805 – via HathiTrust
- Frank Otto Gatell (1959). "Puerto Rico in the 1830s; The Journal of Edward Bliss Emerson". The Americas. 16.
- Martha Ellen Davis (1972). "Social Organization of a Musical Event: The Fiesta de Cruz in San Juan, Puerto Rico". Ethnomusicology. 16.
- Jay Kinsbruner (1978). "The Pulperos of Caracas and San Juan during the First Half of the Nineteenth Century". Latin American Research Review. 13.
- Jay Kinsbruner (1990). "Caste and Capitalism in the Caribbean: Residential Patterns and House Ownership among the Free People of Color of San Juan, Puerto Rico, 1823–46". Hispanic American Historical Review. 70.
- Joseph P. Sanchez (1991). "Infrastructure of Puerto Rico in the 19th Century". Second International Symposium on Historic Preservation in Puerto Rico and the Caribbean. Lectures. San Juan, Puerto Rico: U.S. National Park Service, San Juan National Historic Site. hdl:2027/wu.89074121823.
- J. W. Joseph; Stephen C. Bryne (1992). "Socio-Economics and Trade in Viejo San Juan, Puerto Rico: Observations from the Ballaja Archaeological Project". Historical Archaeology. 26: 45–58. doi:10.1007/BF03374159. S2CID 160583426.
- Ramón Grosfoguel (1994). "World Cities in the Caribbean: The Rise of Miami and San Juan". Review. 17 (3). Fernand Braudel Center, State University of New York: 351–381. JSTOR 40241296. (Abstract)
- Forts of Old San Juan: San Juan National Historic Site, Puerto Rico. Handbook; 151. Washington, D.C.: United States National Park Service. c. 1998. hdl:2027/pur1.32754067979769. ISBN 9780912627625.
- Félix V. Matos Rodríguez (1999), Women and urban change in San Juan, Puerto Rico, 1820–1868, Gainesville: University Press of Florida, ISBN 0813016762

in Spanish

- "Puerto Rico: San Juan". Anuario del comercio, de la industria, de la magistratura y de la administracion de España, sus colonias, Cuba, Puerto-Rico y Filipinas, estados hispano-americanos y Portugal (in Spanish). Vol. 4. Madrid: Bailly-Bailliere e Hijos. 1908. (Directory)
- Adolfo de Hostos (1966) [1948]. Historia de San Juan, ciudad murada [History of San Juan: Walled City, 1521–1898] (in Spanish). San Juan. OCLC 243313.
- José Seguinot Barbosa (1992). "Geografía histórica de la Ciudad de San Juan, Puerto Rico". Boletín de la Real Sociedad Geográfica (in Spanish) (128). Madrid. ISSN 0210-8577.

=== Published in 21st century ===
in English

- David Marley (2005), "San Juan", Historic Cities of the Americas, Santa Barbara, Calif: ABC-CLIO, pp. 185+, ISBN 1576070271
- Arleen Pabón-Charneco (2012), "Old San Juan Historic District/ Distrito Histórico del Viejo San Juan" (PDF), National Historic Landmark Nomination, "NPS Form 10-900"
- Arleen Pabón-Charneco (2017). Architecture of San Juan de Puerto Rico: Five centuries of urban and architectural experimentation. Routledge. ISBN 978-1-317-42358-4.

in Spanish

- Silvia Álvarez Curbelo; Aníbal Sepúlveda-Rivera (2011). De vuelta a la ciudad: San Juan de Puerto Rico 1997–2001 [Back to the city: San Juan de Puerto Rico 1997–2001] (in Spanish). San Juan, P.R.: Fundación Sila M. Calderón. ISBN 9780982080603.
