= José María Marxuach Echavarría =

Puerto Rican medical doctor and politician (1848–1910)

José Marxuach
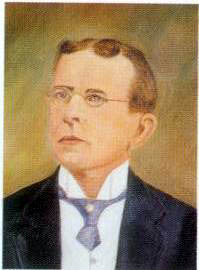

Mayor of San Juan
- In office December 11, 1900 – March 7, 1901
- Preceded by: Manuel Egozcue Cintrón
- Succeeded by: Manuel Egozcue Cintrón
- In office May 12, 1897 – July 1, 1897
- Preceded by: Jose Ramon Becerra y de Garrete
- Succeeded by: Francisco Del Valle Atiles

Personal details
- Born: April 16, 1848 Aguadilla, Puerto Rico
- Died: 1910 (aged 61–62) San Juan, Puerto Rico
- Party: Spanish Unconditional; Puerto Rican Republican
- Education: University of Zaragoza (MD)

José María Marxuach Echavarría (baptized as José Monserrate Marxuach Echavarría) (April 16, 1848 – 1910), was a Puerto Rican medical doctor and politician who served twice as Mayor of the City of San Juan, Puerto Rico. His first administration was before the U.S. invasion of Puerto Rico and his second administration was under United States colonial rule.

== Early years ==
Marxuach Echavarría was born in Aguadilla, Puerto Rico, and baptized as "José Monserrate Marxuach Echavarría". His parents were Francisco Marxuach Ferrer (son of Juan Marxuach Prats and Francisca Ferrer of Mataró, Catalonia) and Beatriz Amalia Echavarría Conti. His mother was the granddaughter of Colonel Rafael Conti y Flores, remembered for his defense of Aguadilla during the British invasion of 1797, and the great-granddaughter of Colonel Francisco Torralbo y Robles, governor of the island from 1794 to 1798.

Following in the footsteps of his maternal uncle, José Rafael Echavarría Conti, Marxuach Echavarría traveled to Spain to study medicine at the University of Zaragoza, from which he graduated in 1871 with a licenciatura in medicine and surgery. After his return to Puerto Rico he worked as a general practitioner in various towns on the island, including San Juan. In 1881, he was designated President of the Subdelegation of Medical and Surgical Sciences of Puerto Rico.

== Political career ==
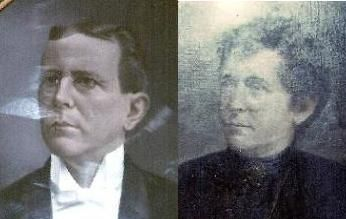
José María Marxuach Echavarría and his wife Josefina Plumey Irizarry

In 1897, while holding the post of Primer Teniente de Alcalde of San Juan, he was selected for the post of Mayor ad interim. During his administration San Juan's pedestrian and drainage infrastructure–and thus its general level of sanitation–was greatly improved; other modernizations resulted in the tearing down of a stretch of the city's ancient presidio walls.

In the midst of the 1898 U.S. invasion, Dr. Marxuach Echavarría assisted Dr. Coll y Toste (then serving as Vice-President of the Puerto Rican Red Cross) in treating the wounded during the fighting in San Juan. The following year General George W. Davis, the American Military Governor of Puerto Rico, allowed municipal elections to be held for the first time since the U.S. invasion. The Puerto Rico Republican Party enjoyed a sweeping victory in San Juan, as a result of which Manuel Egozcue Cintrón become Alcalde; Marxuach Echavarría, who was a political associate of Egozcue's, obtained a seat in the Municipal Council (Concejo Municipal).

In 1900, Marxuach Echavarría was elected Mayor-President (Alcalde Presidente). The dual office, a result of Spanish reforms implemented in 1878, combined the executive duties of a municipal mayor with the offices of a city council president. Marxuach Echavarría was succeeded in office by his predecessor. Dr. Marxuach Echavarría died in 1910.

== Notable relatives ==
Marxuach Echavarría married Josefina Plumey Irizarry (daughter of Juan Bautista Plumey and Petronila Irizarry) in 1873. They had two daughters, Teresa (mother of Puerto Rican radio pioneer Teófilo Villavicencio) and Amalia, as well as two sons, Lt. Col. Teófilo Marxuach and Acisclo Marxuach Plumey (b. 1892). Acisclo was honorary consul of Spain in Puerto Rico in 1935 and held the title of second Grand Master of the Order of Saint John the Baptist of Puerto Rico; Acisclo's extensive art collection included works by Puerto Rican painters Ramón Atiles y Pérez, José Campeche, Luis Paret y Alcázar, and Francisco Oller.

Marxuach Echavarría was also the grandfather of Colonel Gilberto José Marxuach, known as "The Father of the San Juan Civil Defense".

== See also ==
- List of Puerto Ricans
- Other members of the Marxuach family
