= Puerto Ricans in World War I =

Members of the United States Armed Forces

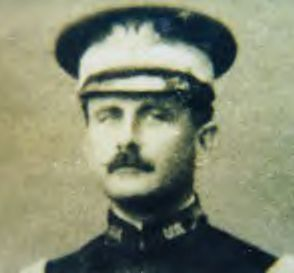
Teófilo Marxuach

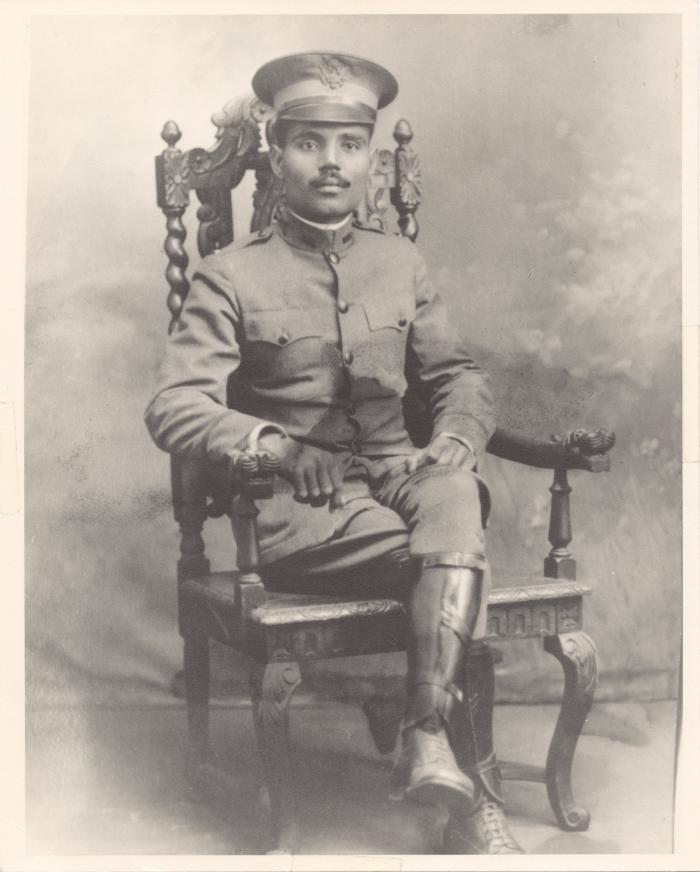
Pedro Albizu Campos

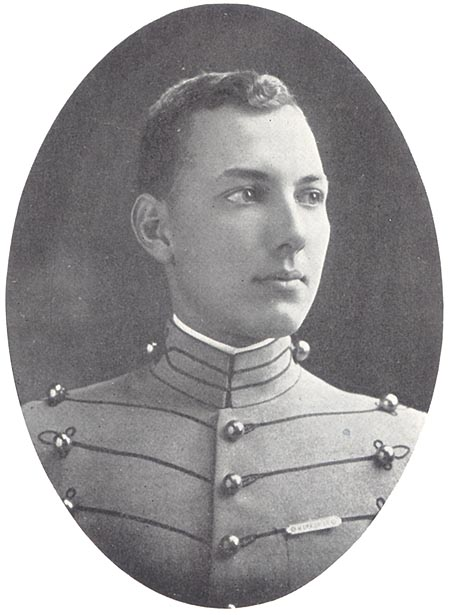
Luis R. Esteves

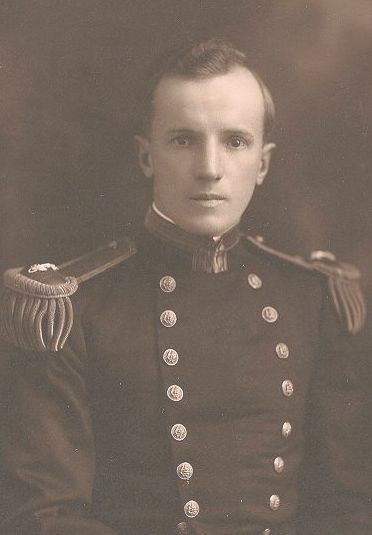
Frederick Lois Riefkohl

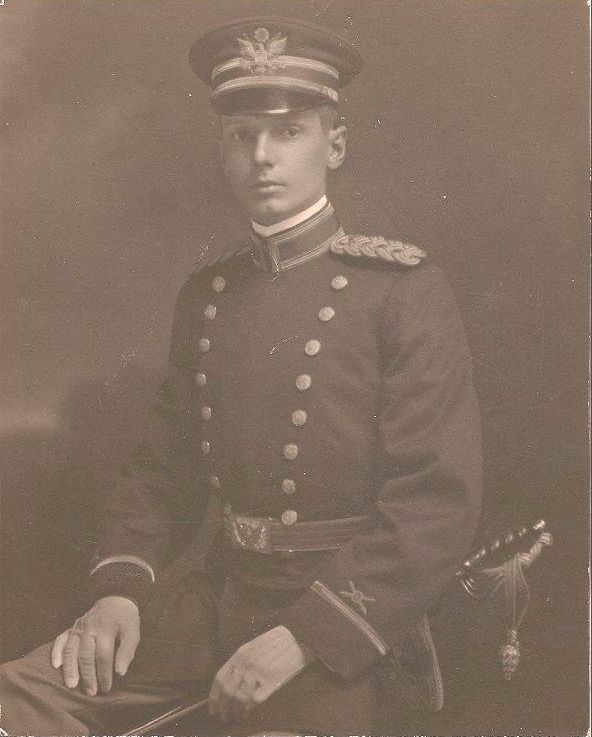
Rudolph W. Riefkohl

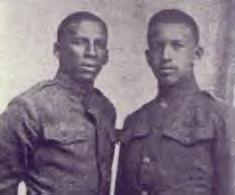
Rafael Hernández (left)

Engagements
- Atlantic
- Mediterranean
- Pacific
- Western Front
- Southern Front

Puerto Ricans and people of Puerto Rican descent have participated as members of the United States Armed Forces in every conflict in which the United States has been involved since World War I.

One of the consequences of the Spanish–American War was that Puerto Rico was annexed by the United States in accordance with the terms of the Treaty of Paris of 1898, ratified on December 10, 1898. On January 15, 1899, the military government changed the name of Puerto Rico to Porto Rico. (On May 17, 1932, the US Congress changed the name back to "Puerto Rico".) On March 21, 1915, the first shots by the United States in World War I were fired by the Porto Rico Regiment of Infantry from Castillo San Felipe del Morro at a German merchant ship in San Juan Bay. US Citizenship was extended to the political body known as Porto Rican citizens via the Jones–Shafroth Act of 1917, (the Puerto Rican House of Delegates had rejected an earlier bill in 1914 because it did not include universal male suffrage). Even though Puerto Ricans were "American" nationals since 1900 (due the Foraker Act) which made them eligible for the Selective Service Draft lottery, they were excluded from the initial draft law. The Puerto Rican legislature and local leaders demanded that Puerto Ricans were included in the draft and allowed to fight in the war. Puerto Ricans who resided on the island had been serving as volunteers in the "Porto Rico Regiment of Infantry," dating back to 1899. As was the case nationwide and under Spanish control, the Puerto Rican units created during WWI (the 94th Infantry Division) were racially segregated. Puerto Ricans of African descent where assigned to the 375th Regiment which was part of the 94th Infantry Division which was the Puerto Rican contribution to what came to be known as the National Army.

Those who resided in the mainland served in regular units of one of the following branches of the United States military, the United States Marine Corps, Army or the Navy. As such, they were assigned to regular military units; however, Puerto Ricans of African descent were assigned to segregated all-black units and were subject to the discrimination which was rampant in the US in those days.

It is estimated that 236,000 Puerto Ricans in the island registered for the World War I draft and that 18,000 served in the war. It is, however, impossible to determine the exact number of Puerto Ricans residing on the United States mainland who served and perished in the war because the War Department did not keep statistics in regard to the ethnicity of its members.

== Puerto Rican military service ==
Puerto Ricans have had a long history of defending their island, having fought off against attacks from Caribs and pirates, against invasions of other European powers at war with Spain which sought to capture Puerto Rico, enlisting alongside General Bernardo de Gálvez during the American Revolutionary War in the battles of Baton Rouge, Mobile, Pensacola and St. Louis, and fighting in Europe during the Napoleonic Wars against the forces of Napoleon Bonaparte at the Siege of Saragossa.

In the 19th Century, Puerto Ricans fought against the Spanish Empire. They fought for Mexico's independence and in the Latin American revolutions alongside Simón Bolívar. Puerto Ricans who resided in the United States, such as LT Augusto Rodriguez, fought in the American Civil War. In Puerto Rico they revolted against Spanish rule and fought for Puerto Rico's independence in "El Grito de Lares" and in the "Intentona de Yauco." They also fought for Cuba's independence in the Ten Years' War alongside General Máximo Gómez and as members of the Cuban Liberation Army alongside Jose Marti. At the end of the 19th century, Puerto Ricans fought alongside their Spanish counterparts in the Spanish–American War against the United States in the Battle of San Juan Hill in Cuba and in Puerto Rico when the American military forces invaded the island in what is known as the Puerto Rican Campaign and against the Philippine Republic during the Philippine–American War.

== The Porto Rico Regiment ==
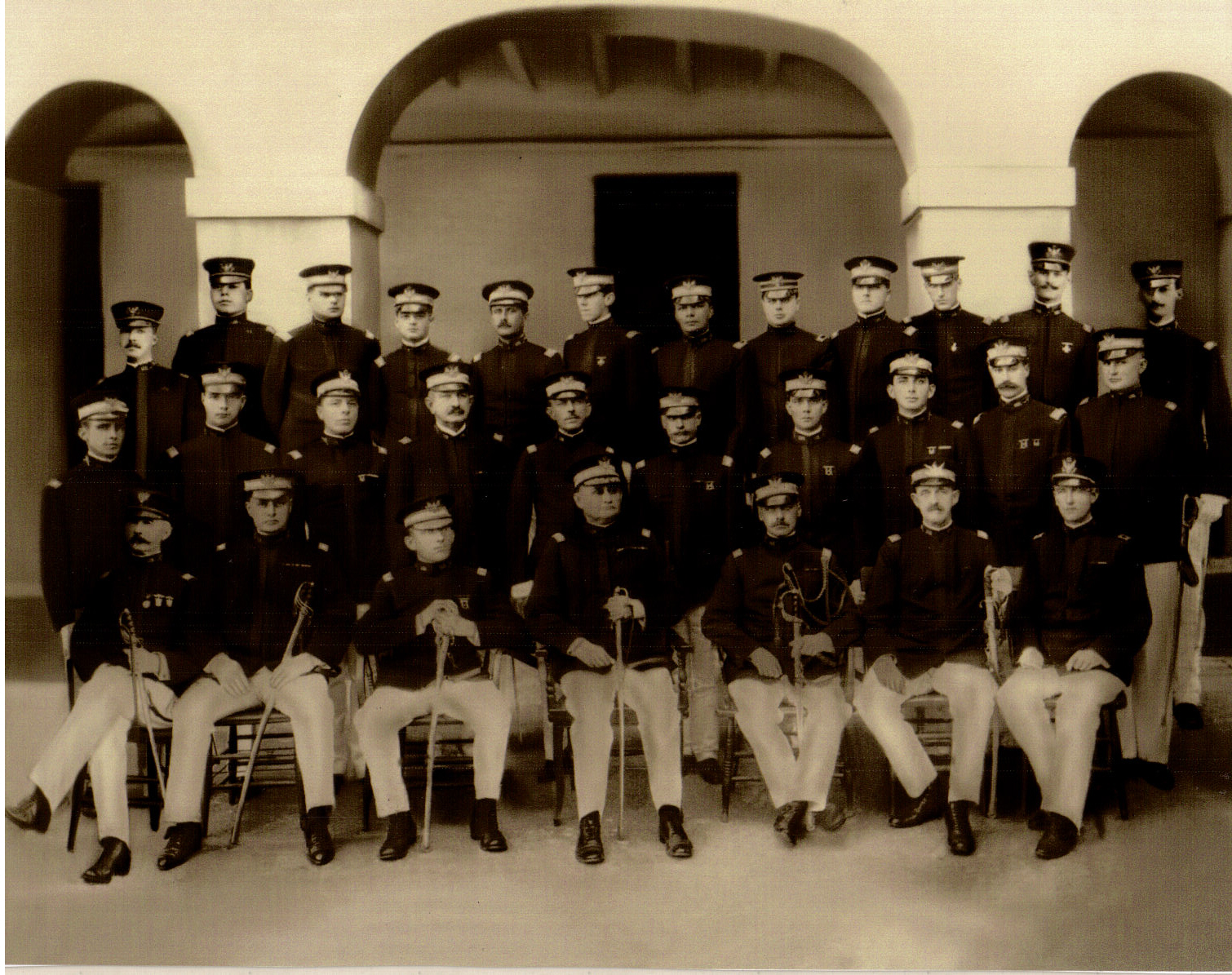
Officer Staff of the Porto Rico Regiment of Infantry (c.1906)

Puerto Rico became a US Territory in accordance with the 1898 Treaty of Paris which ended the Spanish–American War. The United States appointed a military governor and soon the United States Army established itself in San Juan. The Army Appropriation Bill created by an Act of Congress on March 2, 1899 authorized the creation of the first body of native troops in Puerto Rico. On June 30, 1901, the "Porto Rico Provisional Regiment of Infantry" was organized. On July 1, 1901, the United States Senate passed a Bill which would require a strict mental and physical examination for those who wanted to join the Regiment. It also approved the recruitment of native Puerto Rican civilians to be appointed to the grade of Second Lieutenants for a term of four years if they passed the required tests. An Act of Congress, approved on May 27, 1908, reorganized the regiment as part of the "regular" Army. Since the native Puerto Rican officers were Puerto Rican citizens and not citizens of the United States, they were required to undergo a new physical examination to determine their fitness for commissions in the Regular Army and to take an oath of US citizenship with their new officer's oath.

== Camp Las Casas ==
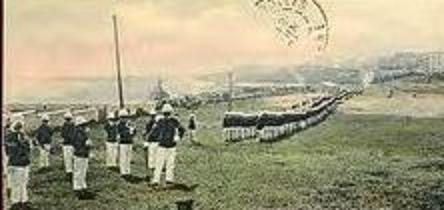
Pto. Rico Regiment training in Camp Las Casas (1904)

There were many military installations in Puerto Rico, however Camp Las Casas played an instrumental role in preparing the native Puerto Ricans for the military. On January 30, 1908, the "Porto Rico Regiment of Infantry" was stationed at Camp Las Casas in Santurce, a section of San Juan, in what is now El Residencial Las Casas, a public housing complex. Camp Las Casas served as the main training camp for the Puerto Rican soldiers prior to World War I; the majority of the men trained in this facility were assigned to the "Porto Rico Regiment of Infantry." Puerto Ricans were unaccustomed to the racial segregation policies of the United States which were also implemented in Puerto Rico and often refused to designate themselves as "white" or "black". Such was the case of Antonio Guzmán who at first was assigned to a white regiment only to be reassigned to a black regiment at Camp Las Casas. He requested a hearing and argued his case to no avail. Captain Luis R. Esteves, who on June 19, 1915, became the first Puerto Rican to graduate from the United States Military Academy (West Point), organized the 23rd Battalion which was composed of Puerto Ricans. Esteves served as instructor at the Officers' Training Camps that were established soon afterwards. He was instructor or commander of three of these camps, which produced all the officers who would lead the more than 20,000 men trained in Puerto Rico during World War I.

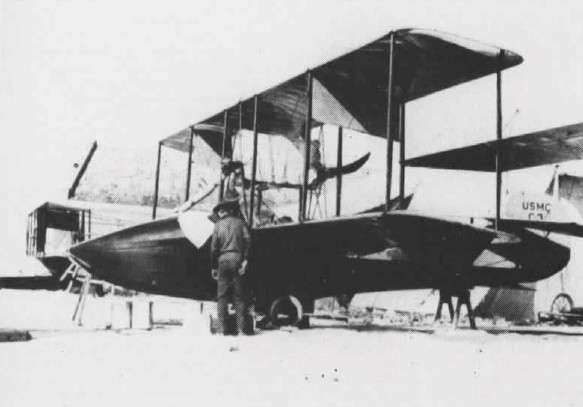
The first USMC plane: a Curtiss C-3 in Culebra, Puerto Rico.

Marine aviation was fairly new, it came into existence on May 22, 1912, and the first major expansion of the Marine Corps' air component, of which Puerto Rico played a major role, came with America's entrance into World War I. On January 6, 1914, First Lieutenant Bernard L. Smith established the Marine Section of the Navy Flying School in the island municipality of Culebra. As the number of Marine Aviators grew so did the avid desire to separate from Naval Aviation. By doing so, the Marine Aviation was designated as separate from the United States Naval Aviation. The creation of a Marine Corps Aviation Company in Puerto Rico consisted of 10 officers and 40 enlisted men.

In addition, several local militia units called "Home Guard" units were organized in various cities and towns to defend and maintain domestic order in the island. Virgil R. Miller, a native of San Germán, Puerto Rico, who in World War II served as the Regimental Commander of the highly decorated 442d Regimental Combat Team, served in the San Juan unit of the Puerto Rico Home Guard; 2nd Lt. Pedro Albizu Campos organized the Ponce unit of the Home Guard.

== "The Odenwald incident", 1915 – USA's first shot fired in World War I ==
Casing of the shell fired at Odenwald

Lt. Teófilo Marxuach's unit of the Porto Rico Regiment of Infantry was stationed at Castillo El Morro Castle, (then part of an Army base called Fort Brooke), overlooking San Juan Bay. The United States remained neutral when World War I broke out in August 1914. However, the Government of the United States in Washington, D.C. insisted on its neutral right to send ships to Europe and that therefore, the German U-boats must refrain from attacking them. US ships carried food and raw materials to the United Kingdom. On March 21, 1915, Lt. Marxuach was the officer of the day at El Morro. Odenwald, and unarmed Hamburg America Line cargo liner, tried to leave San Juan bay without permission from the Collector of Customs. Lt. Marxuach gave the order to open fire on her from the fort. Sergeant Encarnacion Correa then manned a machine gun and fired warning shots, with little effect. Marxuach fired a shot from a gun in the Santa Rosa battery of El Morro, in what is considered to be the first shot of World War I fired by the regular armed forces of the United States against any ship flying the colors of the Central Powers, forcing Odenwald to stop and to return to port. The shots ordered by Lt. Marxuach were the first fired by the United States in World War I.

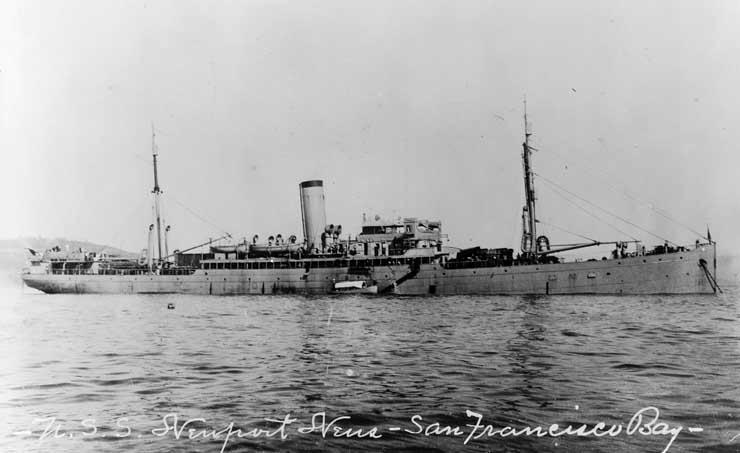
USS Newport News (previously Odenwald) in 1919

Marxuach's actions became an international incident when the German Government accused the United States Government of the holding Odenwald illegally against her will, and not firing a blank warning shot as required by international law. The United States Government responded that the official report of the United States War Department made by the commandant of El Morro, Lt. Col. Burnham, claimed that only warning shots were made and that none was aimed at Odenwald. Odenwald was renamed Newport News by the US Government and commissioned into the United States Navy, where it served until 1925, when it was retired. In 1917 Germany resumed submarine attacks, knowing that it would lead to the US entering the war.

== The United States officially declares war ==
On April 6, 1917, the United States Congress declared war on Germany. By May 3, the Regiment was transferred to the regular Army and recruited 1,969 men and the 295th, 296, 373rd, 374th and 375th regiments of Puerto Rico were created. The United States continued to apply their military segregation policies to the native Puerto Ricans. Puerto Ricans of African descent were assigned to all black units such as the 375th Regiment. Puerto Ricans were to be sent to North Carolina to train for deployment overseas, however Senators from the southeastern states opposed and foiled these plans, citing that Puerto Ricans would be a problem to the laws and customs of the racist Jim Crow policies. Southern politicians were alarmed of the idea of having armed African-Americans in the south and believed that Puerto Ricans of mixed race, who did not understand their racial policies, would only add to their problems. On May 17, the Porto Rico Regiment of Infantry was sent to guard the Panama Canal in defense of the Panama Canal Zone and other vital military installations while the other Puerto Rican regiments guarded Puerto Rico.

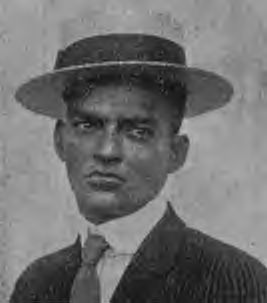
Eustaquio Correa

Puerto Ricans became US citizens as a result of the 1917 Jones-Shafroth Act and two months later, when Congress passed the Selective Service Act, conscription was extended to the island. Those who were eligible, with the exception of women, were expected to serve in the military. About 20,000 Puerto Ricans were drafted during World War I.

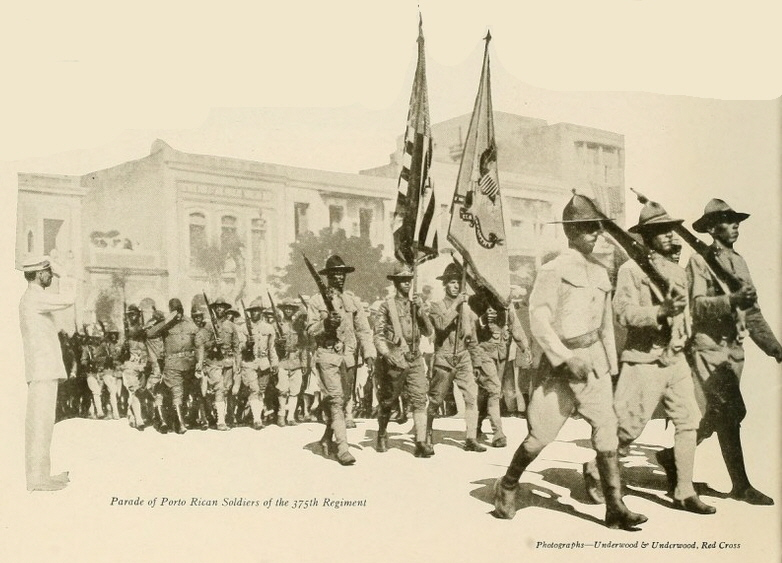
Porto Rican Soldiers Parade, 375th Regiment

In November 1917, the first military draft (conscription) lottery in Puerto Rico was held in the island's capital, San Juan. The first draft number pick was made by Diana Yager, the daughter of the US-appointed governor of Puerto Rico Arthur Yager. The number she picked was 1435 and it belonged to San Juan native Eustaquio Correa. Thus, Correa became the first Puerto Rican to be "drafted" into the Armed Forces of the United States. It is estimated that 236,000 Puerto Ricans in the island registered for the World War I draft and that 18,000 served in the war. Prior to the Jones-Shafroth Act, Puerto Ricans in the mainland United States as all other non-citizens, who were permanent residents were required to register with the Selective Service System by law and could be drafted.

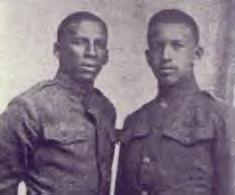
Rafael Hernández (left) with brother Jesús, c.1917 during WWI

In New York City, many Puerto Ricans of African descent joined the 369th Infantry Regiment which was mostly composed of Afro-Americans. They were not allowed to fight alongside their white counterparts; however, they were permitted to fight as members of a French unit in French uniforms. They fought along the Western Front in France, and their reputation earned them the nickname of "the Harlem Hell Fighters" by the Germans. Among them was Rafael Hernández Marín, one of Puerto Rico's greatest music composer and his brother Jesus. In 1917, Rafael Hernández was working as a musician in North Carolina, when the United States entered World War I. The Jazz bandleader James Reese Europe recruited brothers Rafael and Jesús Hernández, and 16 more Puerto Ricans to join the United States Army's Harlem Hell fighters musical band, the Orchestra Europe. The Hernández brothers enlisted and were assigned to the US 369th Infantry Regiment (formerly known as the 15th Infantry Regiment), New York National Guard, created in New York City in June. Hernandez toured Europe with the Orchestra Europe. The 369th was awarded Croix de guerre by France for battlefield gallantry.

Pedro Albizu Campos was a Puerto Rican who volunteered in the United States Infantry. Albizu was commissioned a Second Lieutenant in the Army Reserves and sent to the City of Ponce where he organized the town's Home Guard. He was called to serve in the regular Army and sent to Camp Las Casas for further training. Upon completing the training, he was assigned to the 375th Infantry Regiment. The 375th was a regiment of black Puerto Ricans who were trained by non-Puerto Rican officers for overseas deployment, but the war ended before it could join the fight in Europe. Albizu was honorably discharged from the Army in 1919, with the rank of First Lieutenant. During the time that he served he was exposed to the racism of the day which left a mark in his beliefs towards the relationship of Puerto Ricans and the United States, thus becoming a leading advocate for Puerto Rican independence. Another Puerto Rican of African descent who was sent to Camp Las Casas was Nero Chen. Chen, a.k.a. "El Negro," was Puerto Rico's first professional boxer to gain international recognition and served as a boxing instructor to the servicemen at the camp.

== The sinking of SS Carolina ==
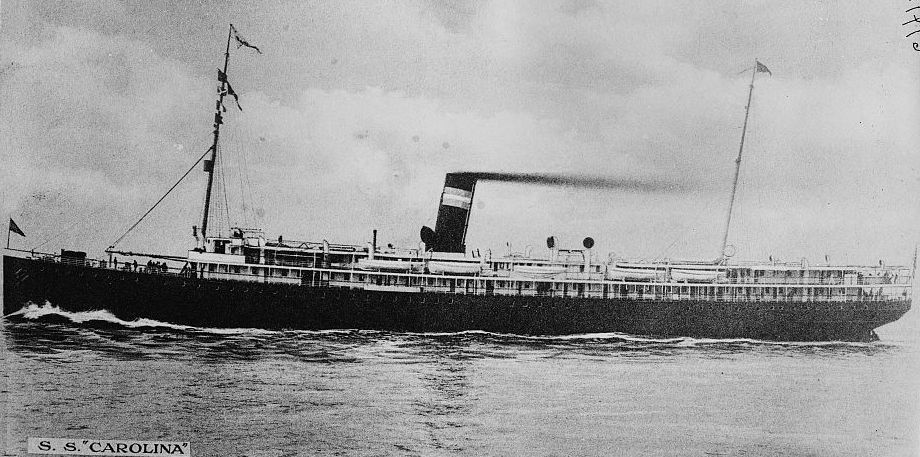
Carolina

On June 2, 1918, the SM U-151, the first German U-boat to operate in US territory in World War I, sank six ships and damaged two others off the coast of New Jersey in the space of a few hours in what is known by historians as "Black Sunday".

Among the ships sunk by torpedo was the SS Carolina, a Puerto Rican passenger vessel. Prior to the sinking, Captain Heinrich von Nostitz, the U-boat commander, issued a warning as to his intentions. Captain T.R. Barbour of Carolina then gave the order to abandon ship. There were no casualties amongst the 217 passengers aboard the vessel, mostly citizens of Puerto Rico, including men from the Porto Rico Regiment of Infantry, when it was sunk.

Carolina was a cargo ship when Juan Ceballos, the owner of the Porto Rico Line (later renamed New York & Porto Rico Steamship Co.), bought it in 1905. The company, which operated from 1885 to 1949, had a regular service route from Puerto Rico (Porto Rico) to Cuba involving several cargo vessels in the transportation of sugar. In 1899, the company converted Carolina into a passenger ship, providing services between San Juan, Puerto Rico, Havana, Cuba and New York City.

== Notable Puerto Ricans in combat ==
Among the Puerto Ricans who distinguished themselves in combat during World War I was Lieutenant Frederick Lois Riefkohl of the US Navy. On August 2, 1917, Riefkohl, a native of the town of Maunabo, became the first Puerto Rican to be awarded the Navy Cross. The Navy Cross, which is the second highest medal after the Medal of Honor, that can be awarded by the US Navy, was awarded to Lt. Riefkohl for his actions in an engagement with an enemy submarine. Lt. Riefkohl, who was also the first Puerto Rican to graduate from the United States Naval Academy, served as a Rear Admiral in World War II. His citation reads as follows:

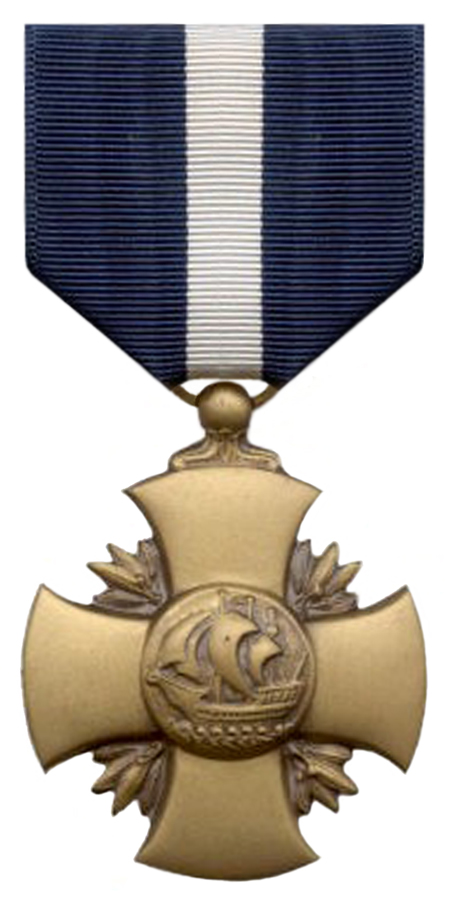

Riefkohl, Frederick L.
Lieutenant, U.S. Navy
Armed Guard, U.S.S. Philadelphia
Date of Action:August 2, 1917
Citation:

The Navy Cross is awarded to Lieutenant Frederick L. Riefkohl, US Navy, for distinguished service in the line of his profession as Commander of the Armed Guard of the USS Philadelphia, and in an engagement with an enemy submarine. On August 2, 1917, a periscope was sighted, and then a torpedo passed under the stern of the ship. A shot was fired, which struck close to the submarine, which then disappeared.

Lieutenant Frederick L. Riefkohl's brother, Rudolph William Riefkohl also served. When the United States declared war on Germany in World War I, Riefkohl was commissioned a Second Lieutenant and assigned to the 63rd Heavy Artillery Regiment in France where he actively participated in the Meuse-Argonne Offensive. According to the United States War Department, after the war he served as Captain of Coastal Artillery at the Letterman Army Medical Center in Presidio of San Francisco, in California (1918). He played an instrumental role in helping the people of Poland overcome the 1919 typhus epidemic.

== Puerto Ricans in non-combat roles ==
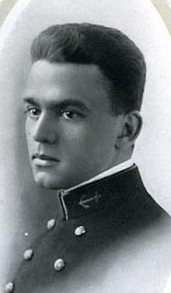
Pedro del Valle as a Midshipman

In 1918, a US Employment Service Bulletin estimated that 75,000 unemployed laborers in Puerto Rico were available for work in the United States. The War Department agreed to transport workers to labor camps in the United States where they would be housed and fed while working on government construction contracts at defense plants and military bases located mostly in Louisiana, North and South Carolina and Georgia. In 1918, nearly 1,500 were sent to Arkansas to work in a picric acid factory. At least 176 died from influenza that fall. Many of these work camps, however, subjected the new migrants to harsh conditions and even forced labor, which Rafael Marchán, a laborer, described in his 1918 deposition to the commissioner of Puerto Rico.

By 1918, the Army realized that there was a shortage of physicians specializing in anesthesia, a low salary specialty required in the military operating rooms. Therefore, the Army reluctantly began hiring women physicians as civilian contract employees. The first Puerto Rican woman doctor to serve in the Army under contract was Dr. Dolores Piñero from San Juan. Even though she was not an active member of the military, Dr. Piñero entered service with the US Army Medical Corps and was assigned to the San Juan base hospital where she worked as an anesthesiologist during the mornings and in the laboratory during the afternoons. Dr. Piñero and four male colleagues received orders to open a 400-bed hospital in Ponce, Puerto Rico, to care for the patients who had been infected with the influenza or as it was also known "the Swine Flu". The Swine Flu had swept through Army camps and training posts around the world, infecting one quarter of all soldiers and killing more than 55,000 American troops.

Fernando E. Rodríguez Vargas, a dentist, joined the United States Army on August 16, 1917, and on September 14, was commissioned a First Lieutenant. Rodríguez Vargas was assigned to the Army Dental Reserve Corps and attended a course at the Medical Officer's Training Camp at Camp Greenleaf, Georgia before being sent overseas to the United Kingdom. In August 1919, he was reassigned to San Juan, Puerto Rico and served in Camp Las Casas. On February 18, 1921, Rodriguez Vargas was sent to Washington, D.C. and assigned to the Army Dental Corps where he continued his investigations in the field of bacteriology. Rodríguez Vargas was there as an educator and investigator of the bacteriological aspects of dental diseases. His research led him to discover the bacteria which causes dental caries. According to his investigations, three types of the Lactobacillus species, during the process of fermentation, are the causes of cavities.

First Lieutenant Pedro Del Valle, the first Hispanic to reach the rank of Lieutenant General in the Marine Corps and who in World War II would play an instrumental role in seizures of Guadalcanal and Okinawa, commanded the Marine detachment on board the USS Texas (BB-35) in the North Atlantic during World War I. In 1919, he participated in the surrender of the German High Seas Fleet.

== Casualties ==
It is estimated that 18,000 Puerto Ricans from the Porto Rico Regiment served in the war and that 335 were wounded by the chemical gas experimentation which the United States conducted as part of its active chemical weapons program in Panama, however neither the military nor the War Department of the United States kept statistics in regard to the total number of Puerto Ricans who served in the regular units of the Armed Forces (United States mainland forces), therefore, it is impossible to determine the exact number of Puerto Ricans who served and perished in World War I. The "Monumento de la Recordación", which is a monument in San Juan, Puerto Rico dedicated to Puerto Rico's fallen military heroes, has the name of Luis Muñoz, inscribed on Panel 5, Line 1 as the only Puerto Rican casualty of the war, however there were more.

It may never be known who was the first Puerto Rican to die in that conflict. The municipality of Sabana Grande claims that Ángel Gregorio Martínez, one of its native sons, was the first to perish in that conflict, and the town named one of its main thoroughfares after him. However, in Luis Fortuño Janeiro's "Album Histórico de Ponce (1692–1963)", the author claims that Juan Sanz from Ponce was the first one to perish in France during the World War I conflict. Fortuño did not specifically state that Sanz was the first one to perish in combat, and there are no known plaques nor any kind of recognitions in Ponce that honor Juan Sanz.

The "American Battle Monuments Commission, World War I Honor Roll" has listed the following Puerto Ricans as casualties: Santiago Cintron, Sergeant, US Army; 6th Infantry Regiment, 5th Division; Died: October 29, 1918; Buried at: Plot B Row 34 Grave 9; Meuse-Argonne American Cemetery, Alberto J. Fernandes, Civilian, US Army; 127th Quartermaster Labor Company; Died: September 2, 1918; Buried at: Plot B Row 19 Grave 10; Suresnes American Cemetery; Suresnes, France and Alfredo A. Lima, Civilian; Died: January 4, 1919; Buried at: Plot B Row 20 Grave 3; Suresnes American Cemetery; Suresnes, France. Also, according to the municipality of Arecibo, native born Mario Cesar Miranda Cruz, died during combat in France and is buried in San Juan.

== Aftermath ==
Puerto Rican migration to the United States increased during and after World War I. Many of those who went to the United States to work in the wartime factories or served in mainland military units made their homes in working-class communities that were mostly populated by Latinos.

The Porto Rico Regiment returned to Puerto Rico in March 1919 and was renamed the 65th Infantry Regiment under the Reorganization Act of June 4, 1920. The 65th went on to serve in World War II and the Korean War, where its members distinguished themselves in combat.

The need for a Puerto Rican National Guard unit became apparent to General Luis R. Esteves, who had served as instructor of Puerto Rican Officers at Camp Las Casas in Puerto Rico. His request was met with the approval of War Department and the Wilson administration. In 1919, the first regiment of the Puerto Rican National Guard was organized; Esteves became the first official Commandant of the Puerto Rican National Guard.

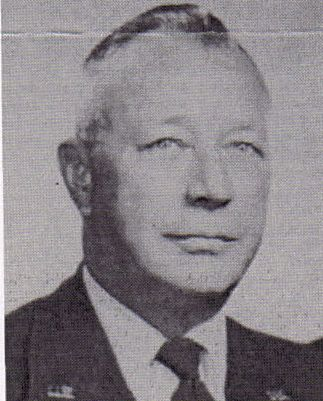
Col. Virgil R. Miller

Some of the Puerto Ricans who served in World War I continued in the military and led distinguished careers, among them: Teófilo Marxuach, who retired in 1922 with the rank of Lieutenant Colonel, as a civilian worked as a civil engineer for the Department of Interior, Luis R. Esteves, who founded the Puerto Rico National Guard and retired in 1957 with the rank of Major General, Virgilio N. Cordero, the Battalion Commander of the 31st Infantry Regimentwho was named Regimental Commander of the 52nd Infantry Regiment of the new Filipino Army, thus becoming the first Puerto Rican to command a Filipino Army regiment. The Bataan Defense Force surrendered on April 9, 1942, and Cordero and his men underwent torture and humiliation during the Bataan Death March and nearly four years of captivity. Cordero was one of nearly 1,600 members of the 31st Infantry who were taken as prisoners. Half of these men perished while prisoners of the Japanese forces. Virgil R. Miller, who led the 442nd Regimental Combat Team in World War II, the most decorated unit in US military history. After the Second World War he retired with the rank of Colonel, Frederick Lois Riefkohl retired in 1947 with the rank of Rear Admiral, His brother Rudolph W. Riefkohl retired with the rank of Colonel and went on to become the mayor of the town of Surfside, Florida and Pedro del Valle, the only Hispanic to have retired from the Marine Corps with the rank of Lieutenant General, served as the Commanding General of the US 1st Marine Division during World War II and played an instrumental role in the defeat of the Japanese forces in Okinawa. Chief Gunner's Mate Joseph B. Aviles, Sr., who served in the United States Navy during the war, joined the United States Coast Guard in 1925, and was the first Hispanic to be promoted to Chief Petty Officer (March 27, 1943) in said branch of the military. Upon the outbreak of World War II, Aviles received a war-time promotion to Chief Warrant Officer (November 27, 1944), thus becoming the first Hispanic American to reach that level as well.

Others led distinguished careers as civilians, among them the following: Dr. Dolores Piñero returned to her private practice in Río Piedras after her contract was terminated at the end of the war., Rafael Hernández Marín continued his career as a musician and is considered as the greatest composer of Puerto Rican music, Pedro Albizu Campos lawyer and distinguished political leader became the president of the Puerto Rican Nationalist Party from 1930 until his death and Félix Rigau Carrera also known as "El Águila de Sabana Grande" (The Eagle from Sabana Grande), who was the first Puerto Rican pilot and the first Puerto Rican pilot to fly on air mail carrying duties in Puerto Rico.

== See also ==
- Military history of Puerto Rico
- History of Puerto Ricans
- Camp Las Casas
- Puerto Ricans in World War II
- Puerto Ricans in the Vietnam War
- 65th Infantry Regiment in the Korean War
- Puerto Rican women in the military
- List of Puerto Rican military personnel
- List of Puerto Ricans
- Borinqueneers Congressional Gold Medal
