= Marxuach =

Marxuach (Eastern Catalan: [məɾʃuˈak], modern standandardized spelling: Marxuac) is a Catalan (originally from Occitania) surname shared by the following people:

- Javier Grillo-Marxuach
- Francisco J. Marxuach
- Pompeyo Oliu Marxuach
- Acisclo Marxuach y Plumey
- José María Marxuach Echavarría
- Rafael Marxuach y Abrams
- Teófilo Marxuach y Plumey
- Teófilo Villavicencio y Marxuach
- Gilberto José Marxuach
- Raúl M. Arias-Marxuach
