= Teófilo Marxuach =

US Army officer (1877–1939)

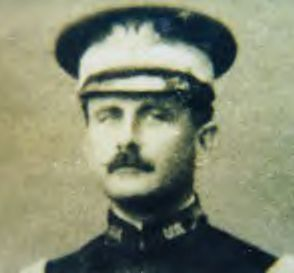
- Lieutenant Colonel Teófilo Marxuach; Ordered the first US shot fired in World War I
- Born: July 28, 1877; Arroyo, Puerto Rico
- Died: November 8, 1939 (aged 62); San Juan, Puerto Rico
- Burial place: Puerto Rico National Cemetery in Bayamón, Puerto Rico
- Military career
- Allegiance: Spain (1900–1901); United States of America
- Branch: Spanish Army (1900–1901); United States Army
- Service years: 1905–1922
- Rank: Lieutenant Colonel
- Units: "Porto Rico Regiment of Infantry" (renamed in 1919 "The 65th Infantry")
- Conflicts: World War I *Ordered the first shot fired in World War I on behalf of the United States

Lieutenant Colonel Teófilo Marxuach, (July 28, 1877 – November 8, 1939), was the person who ordered the first shots fired in World War I on behalf of the United States on a German cargo liner trying to leave San Juan Bay without permission. Marxuach ordered shots from a machine gun, and from a gun in the Santa Rosa battery of the Castillo San Felipe del Morro, in what are considered to be the first shots of World War I fired by the regular armed forces of the United States against any ship of the Central Powers, forcing Odenwald to stop and to return to port.

== Early years ==
Marxuach (birth name "Teófilo Marxuach Plumey") was born in the town of Arroyo, Puerto Rico when the island was still under Spanish rule. His parents were José María Marxuach, twice mayor of San Juan and Josefina Plumey Irizarry (daughter of Juan Bautista Plumey and Petronila Irizarry, among the wealthiest landholders in Lares). His family had historically played a prominent role in the island's commercial and political affairs. Marxuach and his three siblings Acisclo, Teresa (mother of Puerto Rican radio pioneer Teófilo Villavicencio) and Amalia were raised and educated in the capital city of San Juan. He studied military engineering at the Academy of Military Engineering in Guadalajara, Spain from September 1895 to July 1900 and graduated with a degree in civil engineering with a lieutenant's commission in the Spanish Army. When he returned to Puerto Rico in 1901, the island was a United States territory and no longer a Spanish province. Marxuach resigned his commission in the Spanish army and his Spanish citizenship. He then began to work as a civil engineer in the Department of Public Works. He enrolled in Cornell University and continued his engineering studies from 1902 to 1903. In 1903, Marxuach wrote and published "El lenguaje castellano en Puerto Rico" ("The Spanish Language in Puerto Rico"). In 1906, he married Carolina Acosta y Acosta (b. 1887), granddaughter of José Julián Acosta y Calvo in "La Capilla del Cristo" (Cristo Chapel) in Old San Juan. They had three children: Teófilo, Gilberto and Raúl Marxuach Acosta.

== Military career with the United States ==
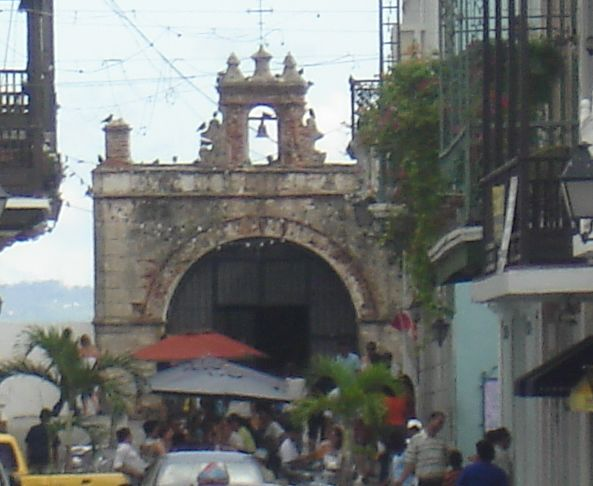
Capilla de Cristo, where Teófilo and Carolina were married

Puerto Rico became a US Territory after the 1898 Treaty of Paris, which ended the Spanish–American War. The United States appointed a military governor, and the United States Army established itself in San Juan. The Army Appropriation Bill created by an Act of Congress on March 2, 1889 authorized the creation of the first body of native troops in Puerto Rico. On June 30, 1901, the Porto Rico Provisional Regiment of Infantry was organized. On July 1, 1901, the United States Senate passed a bill that required a strict mental and physical examination for those who wanted to join the regiment. Under the provisions of an act of Congress approved April 23, 1904 and of Circular No. 34, War Department, July 29, 1904, the recruitment of native Puerto Rican civilians to be appointed the grade of second lieutenants for a term of four years was approved with the condition that they pass the required tests.

Although many civilians from all walks of life applied for the officers appointment in January 1905, only seven made it that day, and one of those seven was Teófilo Marxuach, who had from 1903 to 1905 worked as a civil engineer for the Porto Rico regiment in the Aqueduct of Cayey. On March 3, 1905, he was commissioned with the rank of second lieutenant. An act of Congress, approved on May 27, 1908, reorganized the regiment as part of the "regular" Army. Because the native Puerto Rican officers were Puerto Rican citizens and not citizens of the United States, they were required to undergo a physical examination to determine their fitness for commissions in the regular army and to take an oath of US citizenship with their new officers' oaths. In June 1908, Lt. Marxuach and all the others passed. He was assigned to the unit in charge of the Progressive Military Map of Puerto Rico from July 12, 1908 to December 4, 1908, during which time he was promoted to the rank of first lieutenant.

=== The first shot of the United States in World War I ===
Casing of the shell fired at Odenwald

The United States tried to remain neutral when World War I broke out in August 1914. However, Washington insisted on its neutral right to send ships without them being attacked by German submarines. American ships carried food and raw materials to Britain.

By January 30, 1908, the Porto Rico Regiment of Infantry was stationed at Camp Las Casas in Santurce, San Juan, Puerto Rico. Different units were stationed at other forts throughout the island and Lt. Marxuach was stationed at Castillo El Morro (then part of an Army base named Fort Brooke), at San Juan Bay. On March 21, 1915, Lt. Marxuach was the officer of the day at El Morro. Odenwald was a Hamburg America Line cargo liner that tried to leave San Juan without permission from the Customs Collector. Lt. Marxuach gave the order to open fire on the ship from the fort. Sergeant Encarnacion Correa then manned a machine gun on the wall below "La Fortaleza", the Governor's residence, and fired warning shots at the ship with little effect. Marxuach then fired a gun of the Santa Rosa battery in the upper platform of El Morro, in what is considered to be the first shot of World War I fired by the regular armed forces of the United States against any ship flying the colors of the Central Powers, forcing Odenwald to stop and to return to port, where its supplies were confiscated. The shots ordered by Lt. Marxuach were the first fired by the United States in World War I prior to the official US Congress declaration of war against Germany. The first shots fired after the US Congress declared war on Germany on April 7, 1917 were by US Marines in Apra Harbor, Guam against a launch from SMS Cormoran.

=== International incident ===
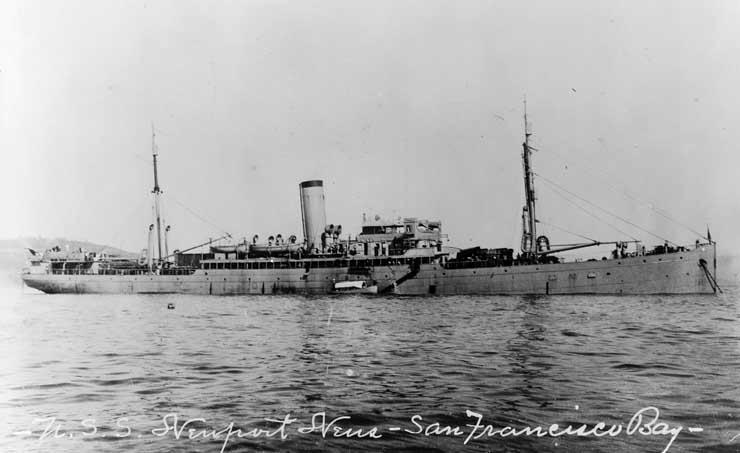
USS Newport News, previously Odenwald, in 1919

Marxuach's actions became an international incident when the German government accused the United States government of the holding Odenwald illegally against its will, and not firing a blank warning shot as required by international law. The United States government responded that the official report of the United States War Department made by Lt. Col. Burnham, the commander of Castillo El Morro, claimed that only warning shots were made and that none was aimed at Odenwald. In 1917 Odenwald was renamed Newport News, commissioned into the United States Navy, and served until 1925, when it was sold. In 1917, the Germans resumed the practice of unrestricted submarine warfare, in part leading to America's entry into the war.

== Service in the Panama Canal Zone ==
On April 6, 1917, the US Congress declared war on Germany and on May 14, 1917, the Porto Rico Regiment was sent to Panama, where Marxuach served at the commanding post at Camp E.S. Otis in defense of the Panama Canal Zone as captain of the infantry. While serving in Panama, he was promoted twice: on June 25, 1918, he was promoted to major, and on September 10 of the same year, he was promoted to the rank of lieutenant colonel. The regiment returned to Puerto Rico in March 1919 and was renamed The 65th Infantry by the Reorganization Act of June 4, 1920. During his military career, Marxuach served at various posts in Puerto Rico.

== Later years ==
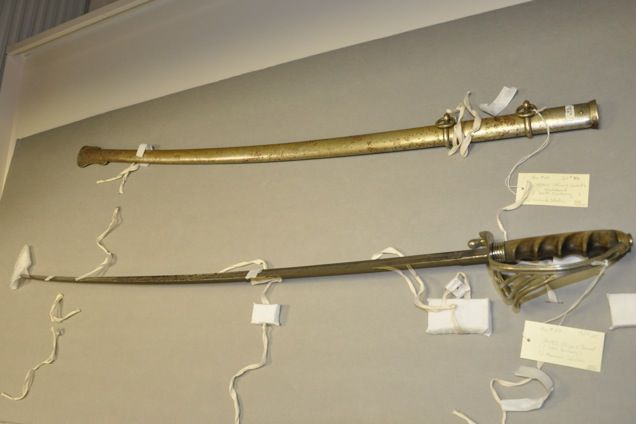
Marxuach's M1902 Officer's Saber (Sword) and Scabbard at the National Historic Trust site at Castillo San Cristobal in San Juan.

Marxuach retired on June 30, 1922, with the rank of lieutenant colonel. He continued to serve with the Organized Reserves of Puerto Rico until November 4, 1922. Upon his retirement, Marxuach worked as a civil engineer for the Department of Interior, in a project known as the Salto de Comerio. Marxuach also worked in the customs building in Old San Juan. Lt. Col. Teófilo Marxuach died in San Juan, Puerto Rico on November 8, 1939, and was buried with full military honors in Santa Maria Magdalena de Pazziz Cemetery in Old San Juan. He was survived by his widow Carolina Acosta Marxuach, three children, his brother Acisclo, and two sisters Teresa and Amalia.

His death not only made news in the local news media of the day, but was posted under the headlines "Lt. Col. Marxuach, World War Figure" in the November 9, 1939 edition of The New York Times. At the family's request, his body was exhumed and on May 3, 1957, and was buried in the Puerto Rico National Cemetery located in Bayamón, Puerto Rico, next to his son Colonel Gilberto José Marxuach (1910–1957) known as "The Father of the San Juan Civil Defense".

== Military decoration ==
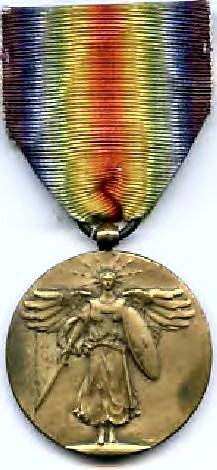
World War I Victory Medal

Congressional Gold Medal

External videos
- You can see a video of President Barack Obama awarding the Congressional Gold Medal to the Borinqueneers HERE

On June 10, 2014, President Barack Obama, signed the legislation known as "The Borinqueneers CGM Bill" at an official ceremony. The Bill honors the 65th Infantry Regiment with the Congressional Gold Medal.

== See also ==
- List of Puerto Ricans
- List of Puerto Rican military personnel
- Puerto Ricans in World War I
- 65th Infantry
- Borinqueneers Congressional Gold Medal
- French immigration to Puerto Rico
- Other members of the Marxuach family
