= Gilberto José Marxuach =

United States Army officer (1910–1957)

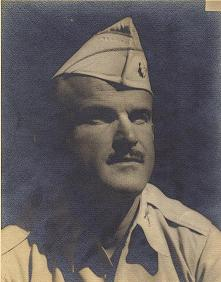
- Colonel Gilberto José Marxuach "Father of the San Juan Civil Defense"
- Born: Gilberto José Marxuach Acosta; November 19, 1910; San Juan, Puerto Rico
- Died: April 18, 1957 (aged 46); Santurce, Puerto Rico
- Burial place: Puerto Rico National Cemetery in Bayamón, Puerto Rico
- Military career
- Allegiance: United States
- Branch: Army National Guard; United States Army
- Service years: 1928–31, 1940–47
- Rank: Colonel
- Commands: 1114th Artillery Co. and the 1558th Engineers Co, 296th Regiment.
- Conflicts: World War II
- Other work: Founder and first director of the San Juan Civil Defense in Puerto Rico

Colonel Gilberto José Marxuach a.k.a. "The Father of the San Juan Civil Defense" (November 19, 1910 – April 18, 1957), was a former officer in the United States Army who in 1951 founded and became the first director of the Civil Defense in the City of San Juan, Puerto Rico.

== Early years ==
Marxuach (birth name: Gilberto José Marxuach Acosta) was born in San Juan, Puerto Rico on November 19, 1910, to Colonel Teófilo Marxuach Plumey and Carolina Acosta Acosta. Marxuach was one of three siblings born to the couple; his brothers were Teófilo José and Raúl José. His family had historically played a prominent role in the island's commercial, political and military affairs. His grandfather, José María Marxuach, was twice the Mayor of the City of San Juan and the only Puerto Rican to serve in said position when Puerto Rico was under Spanish rule and after the island was ceded to the United States. Marxuach's father belonged to the Porto Rico Regiment and had the distinction of ordering the first shot fired in World War I on behalf of the United States on March 21, 1915, and his uncle Acisclo Marxuach y Plumey (b. 1895) was an honorary consul of Spain in Puerto Rico. Marxuach's mother was the granddaughter of José Julián Acosta, a distinguished journalist and a fervent advocate of the abolition of slavery in Puerto Rico.

Marxuach was greatly influenced by his father and grew up near Fort San Cristóbal, where his father was stationed. The experience instilled in him a lifetime love for the military, and served as an influential factor in his decision to seek a career in the military. Marxuach graduated from the Central High School in Santurce in 1928. On June 17, 1928, he joined the Puerto Rico National Guard and received his basic training at Camp Las Casas in Santurce. He was given an appointment to attend the United States Military Academy at West Point, New York, by Theodore Roosevelt Jr., the United States appointed governor of Puerto Rico. However, an automobile accident left him bedridden for over a year. Upon recovery, he was unable to attend the academy because he was over the age limit.

== National Guardsman and educator ==
Marxuach served in the National Guard until 1931, year in which he enrolled in the University of Puerto Rico. He earned his Bachelor of Science degree in 1936, the same year in which he rejoined the National Guard. In 1937, he joined the Science Department faculty of the University of Puerto Rico as an assistant science professor and in 1938 was promoted to the position of science professor. During this time period, Marxuach married Margarita Ginorio Dominguez (December 23, 1938) and he earned his master's degree in Botany from the University of Michigan.

== Military career ==
In 1937, Japan invaded China and in September 1939, Germany invaded Poland. As a precautionary measure, the 295th and 296th Infantry Regiments of the Puerto Rican National Guard, founded by Major General Luis R. Esteves, were called into Federal Active Service and assigned to the Puerto Rican Department in accordance with the existing War Plan Orange. That same month, Marxuach joined the United States Army and on October 15, 1940, was commissioned a second lieutenant. He was assigned to the 295 Regiment at Camp Tortuguero in Puerto Rico and soon after was reassigned to 296th Infantry Regiment.

After the Japanese attack on Pearl Harbor the U.S. entered the World War II. On January 12, 1944, the 296th Infantry Regiment departed from Puerto Rico to the Panama Canal Zone. During this timeframe Marxuach had been promoted three times, from first lieutenant to major. As major, he served as the commander of the 2nd Infantry Battalion of the 296th. Together with his men, he received intense jungle training and was later put in charge of a rescue mission which searched for the remains of various American soldiers who perished aboard a C-45 Expeditor military aircraft which crashed in the Panamanian jungles.

In April 1945, the 296th returned to Puerto Rico and soon after was sent to Honolulu, Hawaii. The 296th arrived on June 25, 1945, and was attached to the Central Pacific Base Command at Kahuku Army Air Field. By then Marxuach had been promoted to the rank of lieutenant colonel and was in charge of the 1114th Artillery Co. and the 1558th Engineers Co.

The American participation in the Second World War came to an end in Europe on May 8, 1945, when the western Allies celebrated "V-E Day" (Victory in Europe Day) upon Germany's surrender, and in the Asian theater on August 14, 1945 "V-J Day" (Victory over Japan Day) when the Japanese surrendered by signing the Japanese Instrument of Surrender.

The 296th Regiment returned to Puerto Rico on March 6, 1946, and was awarded the American Theater streamer and the Pacific Theater streamer. On November 12, 1946, Marxuach was promoted to colonel. In 1947, he retired as regimental executive officer of Headquarters Co. of the 296th, due to a service-related disability. The 296th was deactivated that same year.

During his military career, Marxuach attended the Infantry School at Fort Benning in Georgia for 3 months where he learned the mechanical functioning and tactical employment of all infantry weapons. For another three months he attended the Military Intelligence Center at Camp Ritchie, situated in the mountains near Pennsylvania. Here he studied the organization and composition of foreign armies, advanced map reading, interrogation of the enemy during war, and evaluation of information.

== Founder of the San Juan Civil Defense ==
Marxuach enrolled in the law school of the University of Puerto Rico upon his retirement from the Army. He worked in the institution's Carnegie Library and used the extra income to help pay for his tuition. On June 27, 1949, Marxuach earned his law degree and set up a private law practice in San Juan.

In 1951, Marxuach joined the municipal administration of Felisa Rincón de Gautier (1897–1994), also known as "Doña Fela," the first woman to be elected as the mayor of a capital city in any of the Americas, where he served as municipal legal advisor. Among his responsibilities were representing the mayor on official matters whenever warranted. Marxuach was given the task of organizing the San Juan Municipal Civil Defense and on March 8, 1952, became its first director. The Civil Defense was established during the Cold War to prepare civilians for a nuclear military attack.

== Later years and legacy ==
Marxuach held the positions of San Juan municipal legal advisor and director of the city's Civil Defense until April 18, 1957, when he died after a brief sudden illness in his house in Santurce. Marxuach was buried with full military honors in the Puerto Rico National Cemetery, in the Bayamón. He was survived by his wife, Margarita Ginorio Dominguez (1910–1994) and his three children, Gilberto, Maria del Socorro and Margarita.

On June 26, 1970, the Mayor of San Juan, Carlos Romero Barceló, dedicated an underground nuclear shelter which would house the municipal offices in case of a nuclear attack. The shelter, which is located in a sector of San Juan called Río Piedras, was named the "Colonel Gilberto Marxuach Center" in his honor.

== Military decorations and awards ==
Among Colonel Gilberto José Marxuach's many military decorations are the following:

1	American Defense Service Medal	American Campaign Medal	Asiatic-Pacific Campaign Medal
2	World War II Victory Medal	Army of Occupation Medal	Army Overseas Service Ribbon with award numeral 10

== See also ==
- List of Puerto Ricans
- List of Puerto Rican military personnel
- Military history of Puerto Rico
- Other members of the Marxuach family
