= List of mayors of San Juan, Puerto Rico =

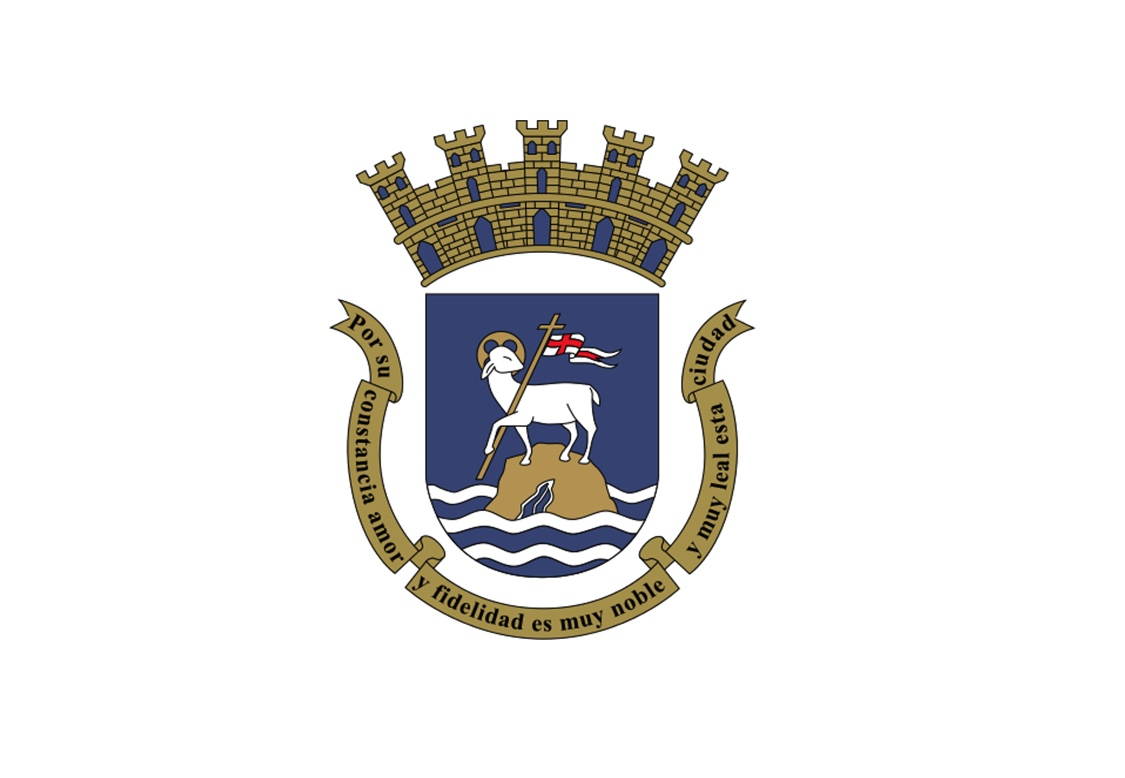
Coat of arms of San Juan

This is a list of mayors of San Juan, Puerto Rico. San Juan is the capital of Puerto Rico.

== List of mayors of San Juan ==
Name	Years	Party
Jose Ramon Becerra y de Garrete	1879–1881	Liberal Reformist Party
José María Marxuach	1897	Liberal Reformist Party
Francisco Del Valle Atiles	1898	Orthodox Party
Luis Sanchez Morales	1899	Orthodox Party
R. M. Blanchford	1899–1900	
Manuel Egozcue Cintrón	1900	Puerto Rican Republican Party
José María Marxuach	1900–1901	Puerto Rican Republican Party
Manuel Egozcue Cintrón	1901–1903	Puerto Rican Republican Party
Jose R. Latimer	1903	
Roberto H. Todd Wells	1903–1907	Puerto Rican Republican Party
Francisco Del Valle Atiles	1907–1910	Orthodox Party
Roberto H. Todd Wells	1911–1920	Puerto Rican Republican Party
Martín Travieso	1921–1923	Unionist Party
Rafael Diez de Andino	1923–1924	Unionist Party
Roberto H. Todd Wells	1925–1931	Puerto Rican Republican Party
Jesus Benitez Castaño	1931–1936	Liberal Party
Bolívar Pagán	1936–1937	Puerto Rican Republican Party
Carlos M. de Castro	1937–1939	Puerto Rican Republican Party
Blas C. Herrero	1939	Puerto Rican Republican Party
Fernando J. Geigel	1939–1941	Puerto Rican Republican Party
Gonzalo Diago	1941–1945	Puerto Rican Republican Party

=== Under the Commonwealth of Puerto Rico ===
New Progressive Party (5)
Popular Democratic Party (5)

Name	Years	Party
Roberto Sánchez Vilella	1945–1946	Popular Democratic Party
Felisa Rincón de Gautier	1946–1969	Popular Democratic Party
Carlos Romero Barceló	1969–1977	New Progressive Party
Hernán Padilla	1977–1985	New Progressive Party
Baltasar Corrada del Río	1985–1989	New Progressive Party
Héctor Luis Acevedo	1989–1997	Popular Democratic Party
Sila María Calderón	1997–2001	Popular Democratic Party
Jorge Santini	2001–2013	New Progressive Party
Carmen Yulín Cruz	2013–2021	Popular Democratic Party
Miguel Romero	2021–present	New Progressive Party

== See also ==
- San Juan City Hall
- San Juan government
- Timeline of San Juan, Puerto Rico
