= Teófilo Villavicencio Marxuach =

Puerto Rican radio broadcaster and independence advocate

- Born: October 2, 1912; Santurce, Puerto Rico
- Died: February 29, 1992 (aged 79); Río Piedras, Puerto Rico
- Political party: Puerto Rican Nationalist Party
- Movement: Puerto Rican Independence

Teófilo Villavicencio Marxuach (October 2, 1912 – February 29, 1992) was a pioneer in Puerto Rican radio broadcasting. Joaquín Agusty Ramírez, Rafael Quiñones Vidal, and Villavicencio are considered (in that order) the three most important Puerto Rican pioneers of radio broadcasting.

== Early years ==
Villavicencio Marxuach was born in the town of Santurce to Rafael Villavicencio Plumey and Teresa Marxuach Plumey de Villavicencio; his maternal uncle was Lieutenant Colonel Teófilo Marxuach.

== Radio broadcasting career ==
Previous to working as a radio host he worked as a print journalist. He was the official on air voice of the informational and entertainment programs sponsored by the West Indies Advertising Company, his programs served as the permanent radio home of popular local orchestras such as those headed by the Brothers Morales, Mario Dumont, Rafael Petitón Guzmán, and Carmelo Díaz Soler. He was also host on various occasions to native artists such as Arturo Somohano, Emilio Bouret, Daniel Capa, Arturo Cortés, Lolita Cuevas, Alfonso López Prado, Ernestico Mantilla, Armando Ríos Araujo, Rafael Seijo, Lolita Traviso and Germán Vázquez, as well as to international stars (including Pedro Vargas, Hugo del Carril, the Argentine Paulina Singerman, and Carlos Gardel).

Villavicencio Marxuach followed the West Indies Advertising Company to their own newly inaugurated radio station in 1942, where he hosted the news program Diario de La Democracia and El Batey, which was both a news and musical variety show, and that he continued to host until 1960. After leaving radio he worked as spokesman for the Puerto Rican Department of Commerce, as a frequent articles contributor for the newspaper El Mundo, and finally as a columnist for El Vocero. Villavicencio Marxuach was a member of the Puerto Rican Independence Party and a follower of independence advocates Pedro Albizu Campos and Luis Lloréns Torres, an interest which resulted in the 1977 publication of Luis Lloréns Torres, maestro en lo sencillo.

== Later years ==
Teófilo Villavicencio Marxuach married Gloria Sabater in 1941 (Ms. Sabater worked for a time as personal secretary to alcaldesa Felisa Rincón de Gautier). The marriage produced two sons Ever and José Rafael. Villavicencio Marxuach died in Río Piedras in 1992.

== See also ==
- Puerto Rican Nationalist Party Revolts of the 1950s
- List of Puerto Ricans
- Puerto Rican Nationalist Party
- Other members of the Marxuach family
