= Manuel Egozcue Cintrón =

Puerto Rican businessman and politician (1855–1906)

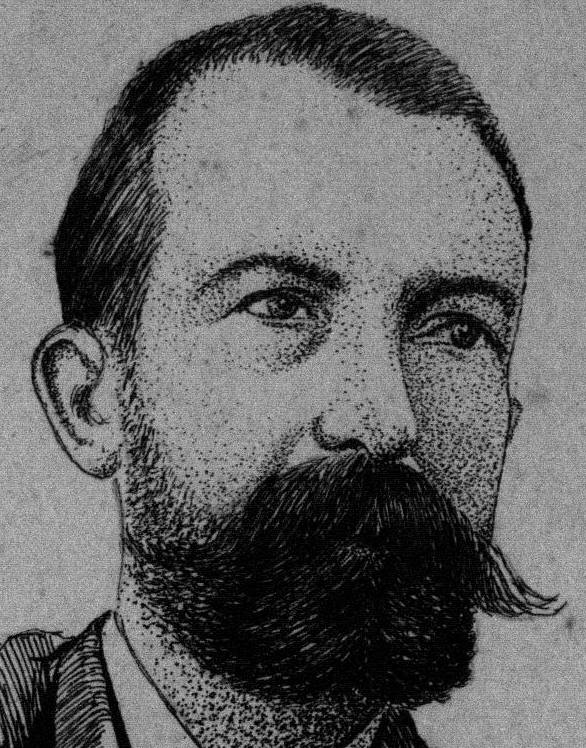
- Detail of drawing of Egozcue Cintrón (by Mario Brau de Zuzuárregui)

Mayor of San Juan, Puerto Rico
- In office 1900
- Preceded by: Richard M. Blatchford
- Succeeded by: José Ma. Marxuach
- In office 1901–1903
- Preceded by: José Ma. Marxuach
- Succeeded by: Jose R. Latimer

Personal details
- Born: 1855 Toa Alta, Puerto Rico
- Died: 1906 (aged 50–51) San Juan, Puerto Rico
- Party: Unconditional Spanish Party, Puerto Rican Republican Party
- Profession: Businessman, Politician

Manuel Egozcue y Cintrón (1855 in Toa Alta, Puerto Rico – 1906) was a businessman and a prominent politician in Spain and Puerto Rico during the late 18th and early 19th centuries. After completing university, he emigrated to Puerto Rico, then an overseas province of Spain, and quickly became prominent in its business circles.

He became an active member of the Partido Incondicional Español (the loyalist Spanish Unconditional Party) and held public offices under the Spanish government, including the vice-presidency of the Diputación Provincial (Provincial Legislature). In 1896 the government honored him with the Orden del Mérito Naval for services rendered to Spain's navy.

After the American occupation, Egozcue Cintrón joined the newly formed Republican Party of Puerto Rico, whose main goal was obtaining statehood status for the island. He served on its board of directors, where he worked closely with party founder José Celso Barbosa.

During the municipal elections of 1900—the first since the beginning of the American occupation—the Republican Party achieved an overwhelming victory, and Egozcue Cintrón became Alcalde of San Juan, a position he held until he was elected a member of the First House of Delegates for the 1901–1902 term. Following the House's seasonal adjournment, he was reappointed to fill Alcalde's unexpired term.

In 1904 he was again elected mayor, but his term was truncated when territorial governor William Henry Hunt ordered his removal from office after a corruption scandal that tainted much of city government. Although Egozcue Cintrón was ultimately acquitted of all charges, the ordeal affected him deeply, requiring his internment in a psychiatric hospital. He died shortly thereafter, in 1906.

During Egozcue Cintrón's terms as mayor, an urban police corps was created to patrol the city, and $600,000 of municipal bonds were issued for full payment of the city's debt and the completion of an aqueduct.

A pen and ink drawing of Egozcue Cintrón was created by Puerto Rican caricaturist Mario Brau de Zuzuárregui, who was the son of Salvador Brau, a Puerto Rican historian.
