= Roberto H. Todd Wells =

Puerto Rican politician

Mayor of San Juan, Puerto Rico
- In office 1925–1931
- In office 1911–1920
- In office 1903–1907

Personal details
- Born: October 13, 1862 Saint Thomas, U.S. Virgin Islands
- Died: September 17, 1955 (aged 92) Santurce, Puerto Rico
- Resting place: San José Cemetery in Santurce, Puerto Rico
- Party: Puerto Rican Republican Party
- Occupation: Lawyer, Politician

Roberto H. Todd Wells (October 13, 1862 – September 17, 1955) was a co-founder of the Puerto Rico Republican Party. A native of Saint Thomas, U.S. Virgin Islands, he was born on October 13, 1862, and died in San Juan, Puerto Rico, on September 16, 1955. After graduating from law school he started law practice in San Juan. He served as a delegate to the House in 1900 and mayor of San Juan from 1903 to 1923. He was executive secretary in the Bar Association of Puerto Rico.

== Family ==
Todd Wells married Celestina Borrás and had a son named Roberto H. Todd Borrás. Todd Wells's son, born on March 6, 1891, in New York City, served as an Associate Justice of the Supreme Court of Puerto Rico and Chief Justice of the Supreme Court of Puerto Rico from 1951 to 1952.

== Death ==
Roberto H. Todd Wells died on September 17, 1955, in Santurce, Puerto Rico. He was buried at San José Cemetery in Santurce, Puerto Rico.

== See also ==
- List of mayors of San Juan, Puerto Rico
- List of Puerto Ricans

== Sources ==
- webpage about distinguished Puerto Ricans
