= José Julián Acosta =

Puerto Rican abolitionist and journalist

José Julian Acosta
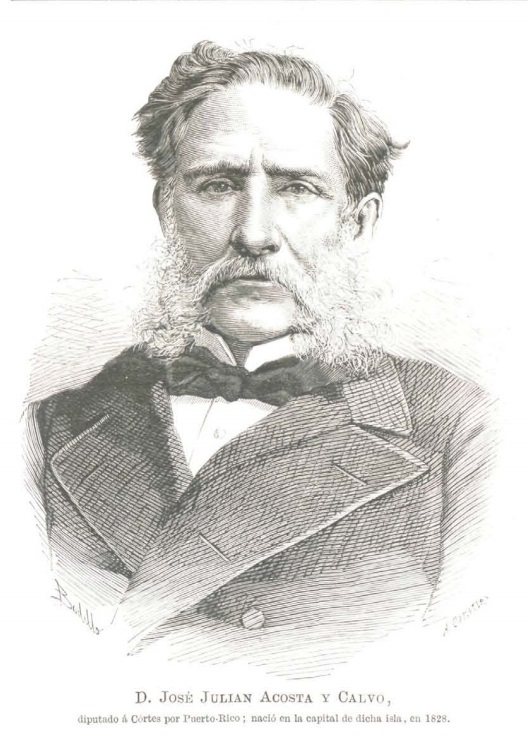
- Born: February 16, 1825; San Juan, Puerto Rico
- Died: August 26, 1891 (aged 66); San Juan, Puerto Rico
- Occupation: journalist

Notes
- He was a student of Rafael Cordero. His great-grandson was Colonel Gilberto José Marxuach, the "Father of the San Juan Civil Defense"

José Julián Acosta (February 16, 1825 – August 26, 1891), was a journalist and an advocate of the abolition of slavery in Puerto Rico.

== Early years ==
José Julián Acosta Calbo was born in San Juan, Puerto Rico to Francisco de Acosta y Sandoval and Juana Antonia Calbo y Garriga. There he received his primary education. He was one of Rafael Cordero's most notable students. Cordero was an inspiration to Acosta and the influence of his teachings remained with Acosta for the rest of his life. Later, he became a protégé of Father Rufo Manuel Fernández, who would send him to Madrid, Spain to study Physics and Mathematics. After he graduated in 1851, Acosta continued to expand his educational knowledge in Paris, London, and Berlin. In Berlin, he was a student of the naturalist Alexander von Humboldt. When Acosta returned to Puerto Rico, he took a job as a professor of Botany and Maritime Sciences and became the director of the Civil Institute of Secondary Education. Acosta was the founder and editor of the newspaper El Progreso (Progress), and he collaborated with many other newspapers which were oriented toward liberalism.

== Abolitionist ==
Between 1865 and 1867, Acosta was a member of a Puerto Rican commission, which included Segundo Ruiz Belvis and Francisco Mariano Quiñones, and which participated in the Junta Informativa de Reformas de Ultramar (Overseas Reforms Informative Board) which met in Madrid. Here, Acosta presented the argument for the abolition of slavery in Puerto Rico. That same year, whilst in Madrid, Acosta was made a member of the Spanish Royal Academy of History, for his work in the editing of Fray Iñigo Abbad y Lasierra's Historia geografica, civil y natural de la isla de San Juan Bautista de Puerto Rico. (Geographic, Civil, and Natural History of the Island of St. John the Baptist of Puerto Rico)

Upon returning to the Island, Acosta, like many other Puerto Ricans with liberal views, was harshly mistreated by the Spanish governor. After the Grito de Lares (Cry of Lares) revolt in 1868, he was suspected of being a conspirator and was imprisoned in the dungeons of Fort San Felipe del Morro by General Pavia, even though he had not participated in the failed revolt. Acosta later published a pamphlet entitled Horas de Prisión ("Hours of Imprisonment") describing his experiences in prison.

== Political career ==
Acosta became a member of the Liberal Reformist Party and in 1870, he founded the political newspaper El Progreso. In 1871 he became an elected representative to the Spanish Courts. In 1873, he became president of the Liberal Reformist Party, but decided to leave the party in 1874, and joined the Autonomist Party formed by Román Baldorioty de Castro.

== Legacy ==
On March 22, 1873, Acosta witnessed the success of his abolitionist efforts, with the proclamation of the decree for the abolition of slavery in Puerto Rico. Acosta died on August 26, 1891, in San Juan, Puerto Rico. He was interred in Santa Maria Magdalena de Pazzis Cemetery in Old San Juan. His great-grandson was Colonel Gilberto José Marxuach, the "Father of the San Juan Civil Defense".

== See also ==
- List of Puerto Ricans
