= Antonio de Alcedo =

Spanish officer known for his important role in the Battle of Coruña (1735-1812)

Antonio de Alcedo (1735–1812) was a Spanish soldier and scholar.

Alcedo was a military officer in the Spanish Army, and a notable historian and geographer. He is best known for his pioneering, five-volume work in American geography and history, The geographical and historical dictionary of America and the West Indies (Diccionario geográfico-histórico de las Indias Occidentales), published in Madrid between 1786 and 1789.

== Early life ==
He was born in a settlement near Quito (Ecuador). At the time of his birth, Alcedo's father, Dionisio de Alcedo Herrera (1690–1777), was president of the Real Audiencia de Quito (1728 to 1737). He left Quito in his second year. During his early age, Alcedo moved around with his father as he took various administrative positions across the vast Spanish empire. His time in Panama, while his father was the provincial governor, was a transformative period. There he followed his father in the construction of fortifications and his fascination for American geography and history.

== Spanish officer ==
At the age of seventeen, Alcedo returned to Spain in 1752 to pursue a military career. The king granted him dispensation for not having yet reached the age of majority. By 1792, he had risen to the rank of brigadier general in the Spanish army. In 1800 he was promoted to field marshal and in 1802 named governor of A Coruña, Galicia.

== Historian and geographer ==
During the traditional height of the Enlightenment, between 1786 and 1789, Alcedo wrote what he called a dictionary, which was another name for a work of reference in the encyclopedic tradition of Denis Diderot: The geographical and historical dictionary of America and the West Indies. The complete name in Spanish is Diccionario geográfico-histórico de las Indias Occidentales ó América: es á saber: de los reynos del Perú, Nueva España, Tierra Firme, Chile, y Nuevo reyno de Granada. In it, he attempted to offer a detailed view of the history and geography of the Novohispanic New World possessions. The work was published in Madrid and issued in five volumes. He claimed to have consulted more than 300 works about the Americas (Indies), including the earlier work of Father Giovanni Coletti, S.J., "Dizionario del l'America meridionale" (Venice, 1771). His travels and his father's works, however, seem to have been the bulk of the knowledge he consulted and the motivation for such monumental labor. Though the Spanish government, alarmed by the information about its possessions seeping out to traditional rivals, banned its republication and exportation, it was soon translated into all major European languages. In 1812, G. A. Thompson translated it into English, and it still serves as an authoritative text.

== Peninsular War ==
As Governor of A Coruña, Alcedo's garrison was able to hold back Marshal Soult's forces while Sir John Moore's troops embarked for Britain, following the Battle of Corunna. He finally surrendered on 18 January 1809.
