= Puerto Rican Volunteers Corps =

Private citizens defense militia

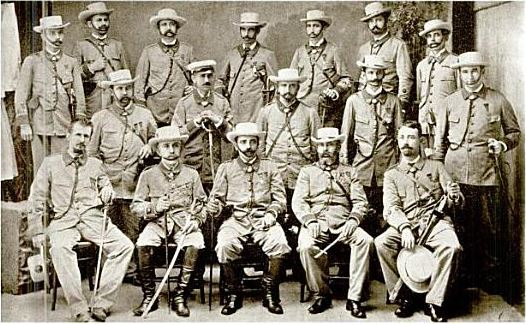
- The Commanding Officer and Staff of the First Volunteer Battalion of Puerto Rico (1897)
- Formation: December 23, 1864
- Founded at: Puerto Rico
- Dissolved: 1898

The Puerto Rican Volunteers Corps (Instituto de Voluntarios de Puerto Rico in Spanish) was a militia composed of private citizens, principally instituted for the defense of Puerto Rico from foreign invasion and local uprisings. Following the example of Cuba, this militia was first established in December 1864 in order to fill the void left by the units of the local garrison sent to the war in Santo Domingo (1863–1865). After a few first years of barely any activity, several Volunteer units were created across the island as a result of the Grito de Lares, the incipient first outcry for independence in Puerto Rico of September 23, 1868. In principle, the volunteers were characterized by their unwavering loyalty to the Spanish Crown, and as such were closely associated to the Partido Incondicionalmente Español (The Spanish Unconditional Party). This party was opened to all Spaniards, both Creoles and peninsulares (from mainland Spain), but the latter played a prominent role providing many of its leaders and ranks. Many in the island's elite joined the Volunteers as a symbol of social status and loyalty to Spain (e.g., Manuel Egozcue Cintrón, Rafael Janer y Soler, Francisco J. Marxuach, Pompeyo Oliu y Marxuach, Narciso Vall-Llovera Feliu, etc.).

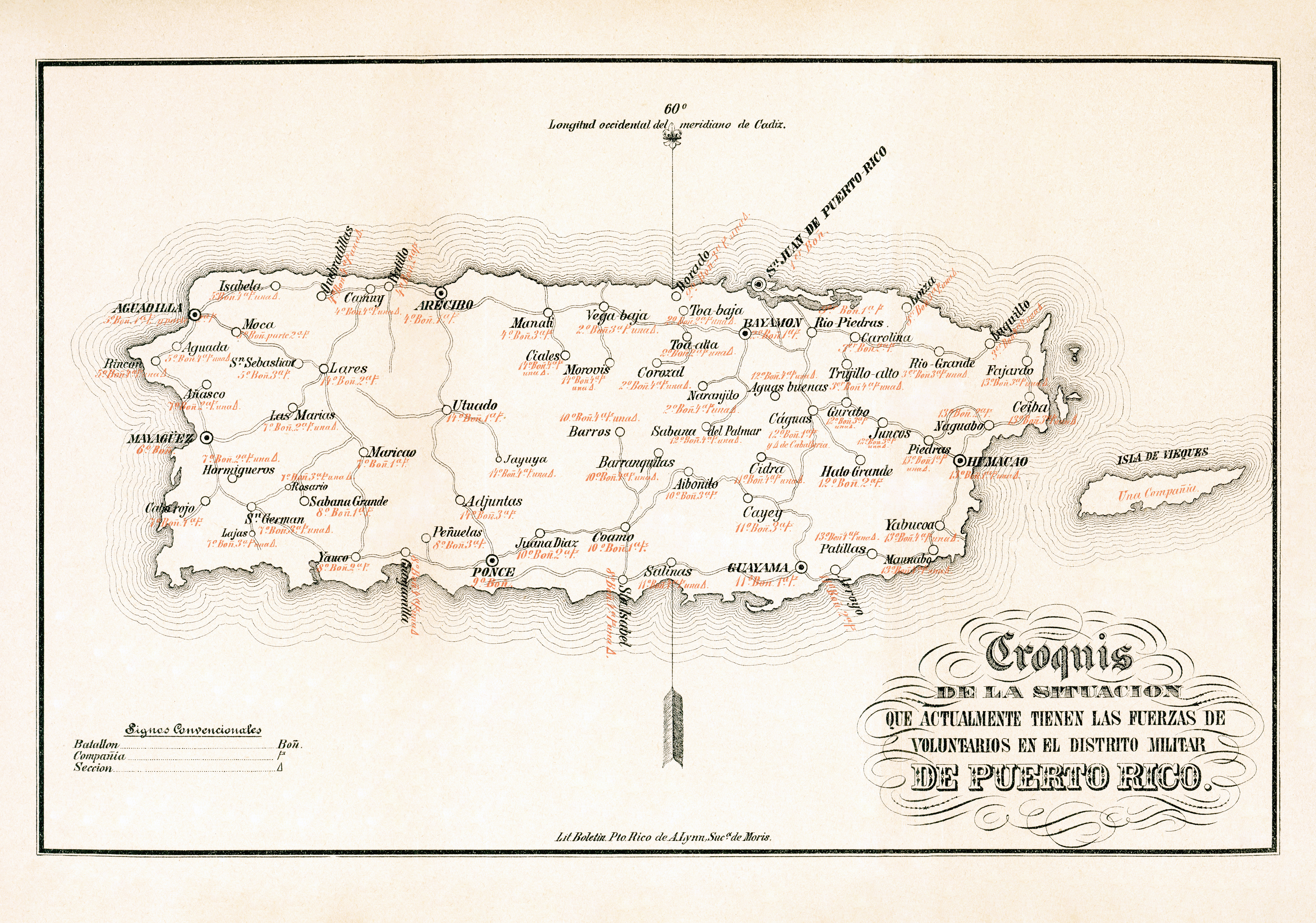
Voluntary military regiments on the island in 1888

== Spanish–American War of 1898 ==
The Volunteer Corps took part in the little fighting during the Spanish–American War of 1898 as auxiliary force of the approx. 8,000 members of the Spanish regular army in its pro forma defense of the island. The Corps's conduct during the war was negatively affected by the distrust showed towards them by many Army officers and the order issued by the Governor having them concentrating in the biggest towns, leaving their homes and families unprottected. Other—though perhaps less quantifiable—factors contributing to Volunteer inaction were the signal winds of change sweeping over the remnants of Spain's once vast imperial possessions; the Cortes's belated attempts at establishing an autonomist insular government in 1897; and the U.S.'s undisguised expansionist aims, combined with the contagion of assimilationist and insurrectionist groups operating from within the island and outwards from the U.S.

Additionally, by the time of the US invasion of the island on July 25, 1898, the Voluntarios and indeed most everyone else in Puerto Rico, was well aware that the city of Santiago de Cuba had capitulated and that Admiral Montijo's fleet in the Philippines had been virtually destroyed. Moreover, it was quite evident that Spain's regular army was not putting up much of a fight for Puerto Rico. Accordingly, the Voluntarios (with few exceptions) were not willing to risk injury or death in a war that was in effect, lost. This attitude was not restricted to the Puerto Rican Volunteers. For instance, New York's Seventh Volunteer Infantry Regiment also refused to enter the fray. Reportedly, they did not want to serve under regular army officers, particularly those who had graduated from West Point.

== Battalions ==
In 1898 they were up by a Commanding Officer and staff consists of a commander, three captains, two first lieutenants, four deputies, a doctor and a pharmacist. His active force was formed by 14 infantry battalions and the company on the island of Vieques.

List of battalions in 1897:

Battalion	City	Lieutenant colonel, first head
1	San Juan	Pedro Arzuaga
2	Bayamón – Toa Baja – Vega Baja – Corozal	Juan Pidal y Ginard
3	Río Piedras – Buena Vista – Carolina – Río Grande – Luquillo	Manuel González
4	Arecibo – Hatillo – Manatí – Camuy – Barceloneta	Vicente Caballero y de las Cuevas Quevedo
5	San Sebastián – Aguadilla – Isabela	Víctor Mártinez y Mártinez
6	Mayagüez – Naranjito – Hormigueros	Salvador Suau i Mulet
7	Maricao – Las Marías – San Germán – Añasco	Luis Zuzuarregui Aguirre
8	Sabana Grande – Yauco – Peñuelas	Manuel Rodríguez Soto
9	Ponce	Dimas de Ramery y Zuzuarregui
10	Juana Díaz – Coamo – Aibonito – Barranquitas	Marcelino Torres Zayas
11	Guayama – Arroyo – Cayey –Cidra	Mateo Amorós i Alsina
12	Hato Grande	Ulpiano Valdés Peña
13	Humacao – Naguabo – Yabucoa	Fermín de Thomas Rossi
14	Utuado – Adjuntas – Ciales	José Blanco Fernández

== See also ==
- History of Puerto Rico

== Bibliography ==
González Cuevas, Luis (2014). ¿Defendiendo el honor? La institución de voluntarios en Puerto Rico durante la guerra hispanoamericana. San Juan: Ediciones Puerto.

Padilla Angulo, Fernando J. (2023). Volunteers of the Empire. War, Identity, and Spanish Imperialism, 1855-1898. London: Bloomsbury Academic.

Rivero Méndez, Ángel (1922). Crónica de la guerra hispano americana en Puerto Rico. Madrid: Sucesores de Rivadeneyra.

Rosado y Brincau, Rafael (1888). Bosquejo histórico de la Institución de Voluntarios en Puerto-Rico. San Juan: Imp. de la Capitanía General.
