= Camp Las Casas =

US military installation established in Santurce, Puerto Rico

- Santurce, Puerto Rico
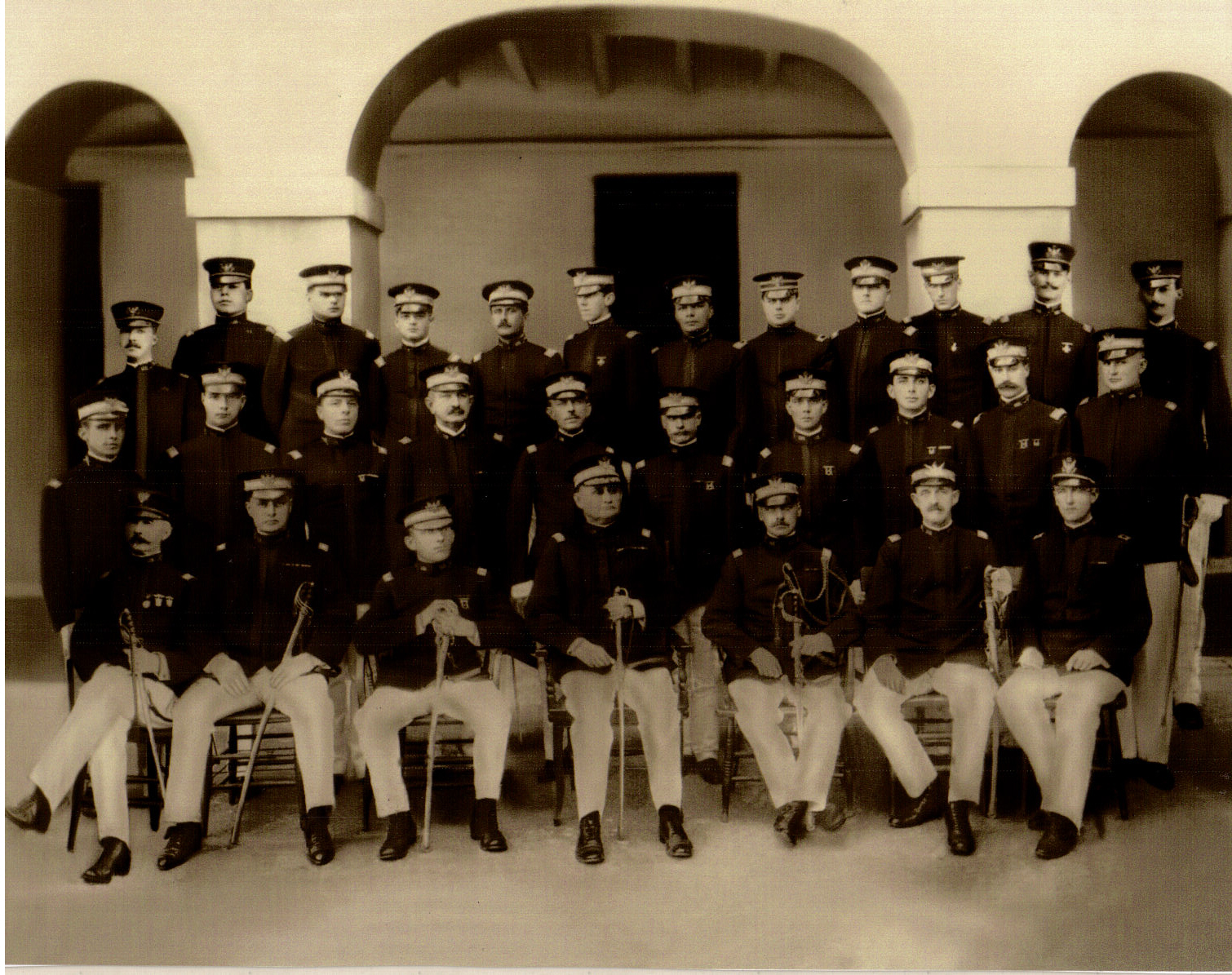
- Officer Staff of the Porto Rico Regiment of Infantry (c.1906) at Camp Las Casas

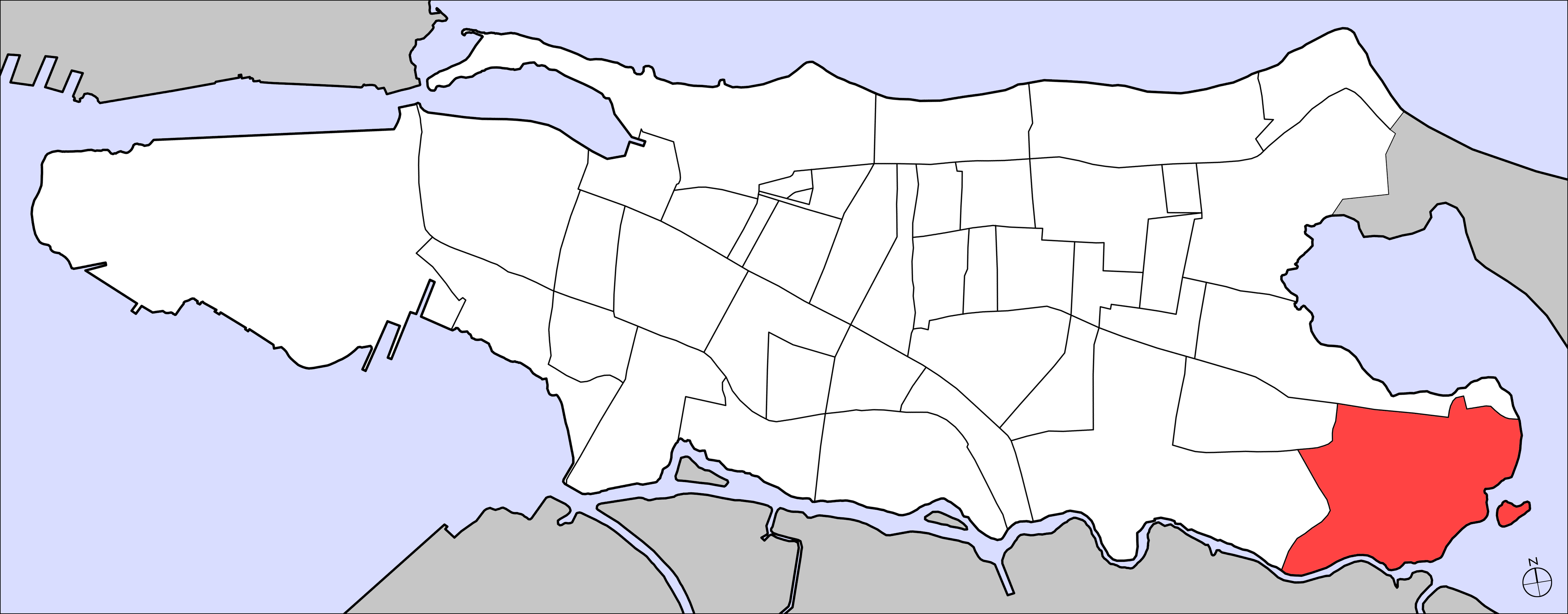
- Location of Las Casas area in Santurce.

Site information
- Type: Military base
- Controlled by: Formerly by the U.S. Army

Location
- Coordinates: 18°25′57″N 66°02′25″W

Site history
- Built: 1904
- In use: 1904–1946
- Battles/wars: World War I World War II

Garrison information
- Garrison: 65th Infantry Regiment

Camp Las Casas was a United States military installation established in Santurce, Puerto Rico in 1904. The camp was the main training base of the "Porto Rico Regiment of Infantry," (Note: On January 15, 1899, the military government changed the name of Puerto Rico to Porto Rico (On May 17, 1932, U.S. Congress changed the name back to "Puerto Rico")) a segregated U.S. Army Regiment which was later renamed the "65th Infantry Regiment." The base continued in operation until 1946, when it was closed.

== History ==
=== Prelude ===
After the Spanish–American War ended, Puerto Rico was annexed by the United States as a result of the Treaty of Paris of 1898, ratified on December 10, 1898. Spain had lost its last colony in the Western Hemisphere and the United States gained imperial strength and global presence. The United States established a military government and appointed Major General Nelson A. Miles the first head of the military government established on the island, acting as both head of the army of occupation and administrator of civil affairs.

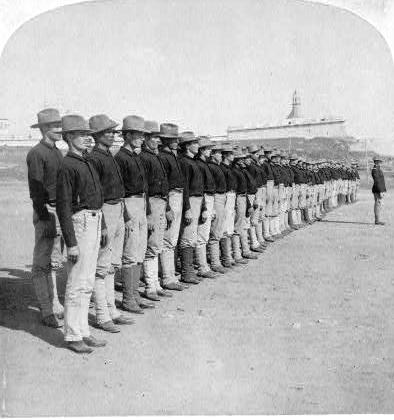
First Company of native Puerto Ricans enlisted in the American Colonial Army, 1899

On January 15, 1899, the military government changed the name of Puerto Rico to "Porto Rico."

The Army Appropriation Bill created by an Act of Congress On March 2, 1889, authorized the creation of the first body of native troops in Puerto Rico. On June 30, 1901, the "Porto Rico Provisional Regiment of Infantry" was organized. On July 1, 1901, the United States Senate passed a Bill which would require a strict mental and physical examination for those who wanted to join the Regiment. Under the provisions of an act of Congress approved April 23, 1904 and of Circular No. 34, War Department, July 29, 1904, the recruitment of native Puerto Rican civilians to be appointed the grade of second lieutenants for a term of four years, was approved with the condition that they pass the required tests. The "Porto Rico Provisional Regiment of Infantry" was renamed the "Porto Rico Regiment."

Though many civilians from all walks of life applied for the officers' appointment in January 1905, only seven made it that day. One of them was Teófilo Marxuach who, from 1903 to 1905, had worked as a civil engineer for the Porto Rico Regiment in the Aqueduct of Cayey. An Act of Congress, approved on May 27, 1908, reorganized the regiment as part of the "regular" Army. Since the native Puerto Rican officers were Puerto Rican citizens and not citizens of the United States, they were required to undergo a new physical examination to determine their fitness for commissions in the Regular Army, and to take an oath of U.S. citizenship with their new officer's oath.

=== World War I ===
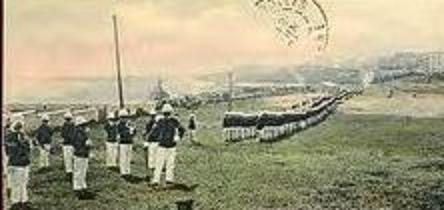
"Porto Rico Regiment" training in Camp Las Casas (c. 1904)

Camp Las Casas was established in Santurce under the command of Lt. Colonel Orval P. Townshend in 1904. The Porto Rico Regiment, which consisted of two battalions of the former Porto Rico Provisional Regiment of Infantry, was assigned to the camp.

=== The first shot of World War I by the U.S. is fired ===
On March 21, 1915, Lt. Marxuach, of the Porto Rico Regiment, was the officer of the day at El Morro Castle (Fort San Felipe del Morro). The Odenwald, built in 1903 (not to be confused with the German World War II war ship which carried the same name), was an armed German supply ship which tried to force its way out of the San Juan Bay and deliver supplies to the German submarines waiting in the Atlantic Ocean.

Lt. Marxuach gave the order to open fire on the ship from the walls of the fort. Sergeant Encarnacion Correa then manned a machine gun which was located along the wall below La Fortaleza, the governor's residence and fired warning shots at the ship with little effect. Marxuach then fired a shot from a cannon located at the Santa Rosa battery in the upper platform of El Morro, in what is considered to be the first shot of World War I fired by the regular armed forces of the United States against any ship flying the colors of the Central Powers, and it forced the Odenwald to stop and to return to port, where its supplies were confiscated.

The Porto Rico Regiment was a segregated unit made up mostly of Puerto Ricans. Puerto Ricans were unaccustomed to the racial segregation policies of the United States which were also implemented in Puerto Rico, and often refused to designate themselves as "white" or "black." This was the case with Antonio Guzman who was assigned to a white regiment, then reassigned to a black regiment at Camp Las Casas. He requested a hearing and argued his case to no avail.

Captain Luis R. Esteves, the first Hispanic to graduate from the United States Military Academy at West Point, was sent to Camp Las Casas in Puerto Rico and served as an instructor in the preparation of Puerto Rican Officers for the Regiment.

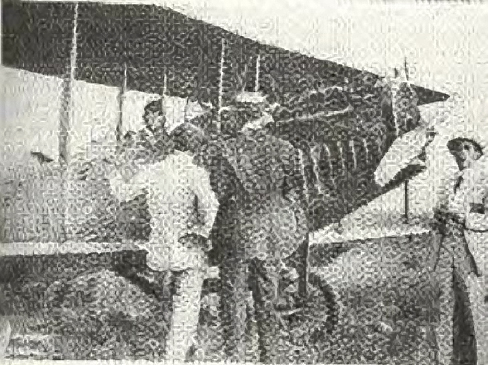
Rigau Carrera poses in his plane (1919)

In 1916, the military strength of the Porto Rico Regiment increased with the creation of machine gun and supply companies and the organization of a 3rd battalion. On January 30, 1917, Puerto Ricans Manuel B. Navas, Enrique M. Benitez, Vicente N. Diaz, Andres Lopez, Ramon S Torres, Modesto E. Rodriuez and Ernesto F. Colon were appointed to serve as Second Lieutenants of the Porto Rico Regiment.

On March 2, 1917, the U.S. Congress approved the Jones-Shafroth Act, which imposed United States citizenship with limitations upon Puerto Ricans (the Puerto Rican House of Delegates rejected US citizenship), and rendered them immediately subject to be drafted, in order to fight in World War I.

On April 6, 1917, the U.S. Congress declared war on Germany and on May 3, 1917, the Regiment recruited 1,969 men, considered at that time as war strength. When the United States entered the war, the U.S. Army Medical Corps believed that they had enough male physicians to cover their needs. Dr. Dolores Piñero applied for a position as a contract surgeon only to be turned down. After writing a letter to the Army Surgeon General in Washington, D.C. explaining her intentions, she received a telegram ordering her to report to Camp Las Casas where she was assigned to the Medical Service Corps of the Army Medical Department. Dr. Piñero became one of the first female doctors to work under contract for the U.S. Army. However, contract physicians had little status within the military. They did not wear uniforms and had little authority.

Captain Luis Esteves, instructor and trainer of the Puerto Ricans who served as Officers in the Regiment, helped organize the 23rd Battalion composed solely of Puerto Ricans, for deployment. On May 14, 1917, the Porto Rico Regiment was sent to Panama in defense of the Panama Canal Zone. It is estimated that, while in Panama, 335 Puerto Ricans were wounded by the chemical gas experimentation which the United States conducted as part of its active chemical weapons program. The Regiment returned to Puerto Rico in March 1919 and was renamed the "65th Infantry Regiment" by the Reorganization Act of June 4, 1920.

In 1919, Félix Rigau Carrera, also known as El Águila de Sabana Grande (The Eagle from Sabana Grande), made a historical flight out of Camp Las Casas by becoming the first pilot to fly an air mail route. By that time (1919), Camp Las Casas was also being used as an air base.

=== World War II ===
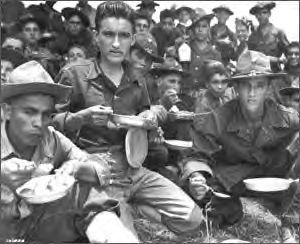
Soldiers of the 65th Infantry, from Camp Las Casas, training in Salinas, Puerto Rico, August 1941

On May 17, 1932, U.S. Congress changed the name of the island from "Porto Rico" back to "Puerto Rico." In 1937 Japan invaded China, and in September 1939 Germany invaded Poland. During that period of time, Puerto Rico's economy was suffering from the consequences of the Great Depression, and unemployment was widespread. This unemployment was one of the reasons that some Puerto Ricans chose to join the Armed Forces.

Most of these men were trained in Camp Las Casas, and assigned to the 65th Infantry Regiment. As rumors of war spread, and U.S. involvement appeared more imminent, the 65th Infantry was ordered to intensify its maneuvers. Many of these were carried out at Punta Salinas near the town of Salinas in Puerto Rico. Those who were assigned to the 295th and 296th regiments of the Puerto Rico National Guard received their training at Camp Tortuguero, near the town of Vega Baja.

The 65th Infantry Regiment continued to train at Camp Las Casas under the command of Colonel John R. Mendenhall. On November 25, 1943, Colonel Antulio Segarra succeeded Colonel Mendenhall and assumed the command of Puerto Rico's 65th Infantry Regiment, which at the time was conducting security missions in the jungles of Panama. Thus, Segarra became the first Puerto Rican Regular Army officer to command a Regular Army Regiment.

In January 1944, the Regiment was embarked for Jackson Barracks in New Orleans and later sent to Fort Eustis in Newport News, Virginia in preparation for overseas deployment to North Africa. After they arrived at Casablanca, they underwent further training. By April 29, 1944, the Regiment had landed in Italy and moved on to Corsica. On June 21, 1944, Segarra was succeeded by Col. Paul G. Daly, in command of the 65th Infantry Regiment.

The American participation in the Second World War came to an end in Europe on May 8, 1945, when the western Allies celebrated "V-E Day" (Victory in Europe Day) upon Germany's surrender, and in the Asian theater on August 14, 1945 "V-J Day" (Victory over Japan Day) when the Japanese surrendered by signing the Japanese Instrument of Surrender.

On October 27, 1945, the 65th Infantry, which had participated in the battles of Naples–Fogis, Rome–Arno, central Europe, and of the Rhineland, sailed home from France. Arriving at Puerto Rico on November 9, 1945, they were received by the local population as national heroes and given a victorious reception at the Military Terminal of Camp Buchanan. Afterwards, the Regiment returned to Camp Las Casas.

=== Post–World War II ===
After the war the United States reduced its military force and Camp Las Casas closed in 1946. In 1950, a public housing project named Residencial Las Casas was built in the area where the camp once stood.

=== Legacy ===
In 2019 a lake at Fort Buchanan army base was named Las Casas Lake in honor of Camp Las Casas.

== Notable people who served in Camp Las Casas ==
Among the notable people whose actions at one time or another have been linked to Camp Las Casa were the following:

Table: Notable Puerto Ricans who served in Camp Las Casas
Highest rank reached	Name	Notability
Major General	Juan César Cordero Dávila	Commanding officer of the 65th Infantry Regiment during the Korean War.
Major General	Luis R. Esteves	Founder of the Puerto Rico National Guard.
Colonel	Virgil R. Miller	The 442nd Regimental Combat Team Commander who led the rescue of the "Lost Battalion" during World War II.
Colonel	Carlos Betances Ramirez	Only Puerto Rican officer to command an infantry battalion in the Korean War.
Colonel	Antulio Segarra	First Puerto Rican Regular Army officer to command a Regular Army regiment.
Colonel	Gilberto José Marxuach	"Father of the San Juan Civil Defense."
Lieutenant Colonel	Teófilo Marxuach	Ordered the firing of the first shot of World War I, by the armed forces of the United States, against a ship flying the colors of the Central Powers.
Major, DDS	Fernando E. Rodríguez Vargas	Discovered the bacteria which causes dental caries.
Second Lieutenant	Pedro Albizu Campos	Later became the President of the Puerto Rican Nationalist Party.
Sergeant First Class	Agustín Ramos Calero	One of the most decorated soldiers in the United States (22 decorations) during World War II.
Sergeant First Class	Modesto Cartagena	The most decorated Puerto Rican soldier in history.
MD	Dolores Piñero	Among the first female doctors to be contracted by the US Army.
Boxer	Nero Chen	Puerto Rico's first professional boxer. Chen provided boxing instructions to the troops in the camp.

== See also ==
- List of Puerto Ricans Missing in Action in the Korean War
- List of Puerto Rican military personnel
- Henry Barracks, Puerto Rico
- Residencial Las Casas

Other military articles related to Puerto Rico:

- Military history of Puerto Rico
- Puerto Ricans in World War I
- Puerto Ricans in World War II
- Puerto Ricans in the Vietnam War
- Borinqueneers Congressional Gold Medal
