= Nero Chen =

Puerto Rican boxer

- Born: 1890; Puerto Rico
- Died: 1924 (aged 33–34); New York City
- Occupation: Boxer

Nero Chen (c. 1890–1924), a.k.a. El Negro, was Puerto Rico's first professional boxer to gain international recognition.

== Boxing career ==
Little is known about Chen's early years except that "Nero Chen" was his nickname, and that he was born in Puerto Rico.

He became interested in boxing and trained with the military personnel stationed in Camp Las Casas. A boxing championship was held in Las Casas known as the Campeonato Las Casas (Las Casas Championship).

Chen moved to New York City and lived in Harlem.

There he continued to train in the sport of boxing. In 1917, Chen became the first Puerto Rican professional boxer when he fought "Panama" Joe Gans at the Palace Casino on 136th Street and Lenox Avenue in Manhattan, New York City. At the time Chen, a Puerto Rican of African descent, went by the name of El Negro. He lost his first fight against Gans, but beat him in the rematch.

Chen's manager had him change his professional boxing name from Nero Chen to El Negro. Chen went to Havana, Cuba at 170 lbs. and fought a Cuban heavyweight named Espagaguerra, and lost.

== Later years ==
In 1918, Chen returned to Puerto Rico and served as a boxing instructor int Camp Las Casas. Chen moved to New York where he died of tuberculosis in 1924.

== See also ==
- List of Puerto Ricans
- List of Puerto Rican boxing world champions
