= Ramón Atiles y Pérez =

Puerto Rican painter

- Born: 1804; Ponce, Puerto Rico
- Died: 1875 (aged 70–71); Puerto Rico
- Known for: Miniature portrait painting
- Notable work: Portraits of Puerto Rican bourgeois sitters
- Movement: 19th-century portraiture

Ramón Atiles y Pérez (1804–1875), who was born in Ponce, Puerto Rico, was a painter known for his miniature portraits of bourgeois sitters. Many of his paintings are held in important private and public collections, such as the Museo de Arte de Puerto Rico and the Smithsonian American Art Museum.

== Sources ==
Benson, Elizabeth P, Retratos 2004.
