= Felisa Rincón de Gautier =

Puerto Rican politician (1897–1994)

Mayor of San Juan
- In office January 2, 1947 – January 2, 1969
- Preceded by: Roberto Sánchez Vilella
- Succeeded by: Carlos Romero Barceló

Personal details
- Born: Felisa Rincón Marrero; January 9, 1897 Ceiba, Puerto Rico
- Died: September 16, 1994 (aged 97) San Juan, Puerto Rico
- Resting place: Capital Municipal Cemetery in Río Piedras, Puerto Rico
- Party: Popular Democratic Party
- Other political affiliations: Democratic
- Spouse: Genaro A. Gautier
- Profession: Pharmacist

Felisa Rincón de Gautier (Note: This name uses Spanish marriage naming customs; the first is the maiden family name "Rincón" and the second or matrimonial family name is "Gautier".) (née Rincón y Marrero), also known as Doña Fela, (January 9, 1897 – September 16, 1994) was a Puerto Rican politician who served as the mayor of the city of San Juan, Puerto Rico. She was the first woman to be elected as mayor of a capital city in the Americas.

== Early years ==
Rincón de Gautier was born on January 9, 1897, in Ceiba, Puerto Rico. She was the oldest of nine children — Felisa, Josefina, Cecilia, Esilda, Ramón, Rafael, Enrique, and Rita. Her father, attorney Enrique Rincón Plumey, was of Spanish descent; her direct paternal grandfather, Francisco Rincón Martín, came from Salamanca, Spain. She was politically influenced by her father, who was from the family of an earlier mayor of Yabucoa. Her mother, teacher Rita Marrero Rivera, died when she was around 11 years old. After her mother died, her father married Mercedes Acha, the mother of her half brother Manuel. Felisa ran the household and raised her younger brothers and sisters.

Her father was determined to give Felisa the best education possible. She went to school in Fajardo, Humacao and Santurce, however she did not graduate from high school. Her conservative father removed her from high school during her junior year, intending to prevent any involvement with male students. However, she worked on her sewing skills while caretaking. While Rincón was operating his shop, she would personally refer people that came to her with issues to other figures within the PPD. During the summers, she visited her uncle in San Lorenzo, where she learned how to prepare medications and became a pharmacist. However, the obligations with her siblings prevented her from taking the final examinationsfor this career.

In the early 20th century, "there was no welfare on the island; no social department to provide money or clothing or food for the poor (but) no jíbaro would let another jíbaro starve. This was the most important truth she learned. The jíbaros were a people steeped in tradition, the noblest of which was their hospitality."

An expert seamstress, Felisa set herself the goal of creating employment in Puerto Rico by launching a local clothing factory. In order to master necessary skills, she worked for two years in New York City during the Great Depression, living with relatives, including her sister Josefina.

Upon her return to San Juan, she entered the wholesale/retail business and opened Felisa's Style Shop on Calle Fortaleza in Old San Juan. She also managed a flower shop called Miles de Flores. Throughout her lifetime, she remained closely tied to the Roman Catholic Church, as she directed her efforts to raising the standards of living for impoverished Puerto Ricans.

== Women's rights activist ==
Rincón de Gautier was a firm believer in the women's right to vote and was an active participant in the suffragist movement, motivating many women to register. When the law allowing women to vote was passed, Rincón de Gautier was the fifth woman to officially register. In 1932, she joined the Liberal Party of Puerto Rico, which believed in Puerto Rico's independence, and was named representative by the party's president Antonio R. Barceló. Motivated by the political ideas of Luis Muñoz Marín, she left the Liberal Party and in 1938 helped organize the Popular Democratic Party of Puerto Rico.

== Marriage and family ==
In 1940, Rincón de Gautier married San Juan lawyer Genaro A. Gautier, who served as the Assistant Attorney General of Puerto Rico and Secretary General of the Popular Democratic Party. They had no children.

== Political career ==
In 1946, Rincón de Gautier was appointed mayor of San Juan, becoming the first female mayor of a capital city in the Americas. Her decision to follow in Muñoz Marín's footsteps despite knowing that the chances of winning were slim led to confrontations with her father, a supporter of Barceló. Despite not being keen on her staying in politics, Gautier collaborated with her career. When Rincón took office, San Juan had a budget of $2,500,000.

Rincón was mayor of San Juan for 22 years, from 1946 to 1968. Under her leadership, San Juan was transformed into a Latin-American urban center. Rincón de Gautier designed innovative public services and established the first preschool centers, called Las Escuelas Maternales, which would eventually become the model for the Head Start programs in the United States. She also renovated the public health system and was responsible for the establishment of the School of Medicine in San Juan. Her administration would also giveaway essential items such as clothing to the poor. Cultural interest led to promoting the tradition of parrandas during the Christmas. She was buried at the Monacillos Cemetery in San Juan.

Rincón worked with Ricardo Alegría to restore and conserve the historical structures of Old San Juan and provided housing and basic services to thousands of people. In 1951, during the Cold War era, she ordered the establishment of the island's first Civil Defense system which was under the directorship of Colonel Gilberto José Marxuach. She often opened City Hall to the public and listened to concerns of the residents of the city. In 1959, San Juan was awarded the All American City Award.

Rincón de Gautier started a Christmas tradition, which would be continued every year by the governors of Puerto Rico. On the Día de los Reyes (Three Kings Day), celebrated on January 6, she would bring gifts and treats to the poor and needy children. In 1952, 1953 and 1954, she had planeloads of snow delivered to San Juan so that the children who had never seen or played in snow would be able to do so.

She participated as a delegate in the Democratic Party nominating conventions. Her last convention in 1992 and at 95 years old, she was the oldest delegate to attend. Muñoz Marín was not supportive of her campaigns with the Democratic Party, but did not openly oppose them.

== Later years ==
Rincón opted not to run due to personal reasons, believing that San Juan needed a different administrator after a long term. Despite remaining relatively healthy late in her life, Rincón suffered several falls that resulted in fractures on both arms, a leg and a shoulder. In retirement, she harvested a variety of endemic or traditional fruit trees on her land. Upon retiring as mayor, Rincón de Gautier served as the American Goodwill Ambassador for four United States presidents. She served in Latin America, Asia, and Europe promoting friendship between those regions and the United States.

Felisa Rincón de Gautier died due to a heart attack and a rumored stroke on in San Juan, on September 16, 1994 at the age of 97, and she was given the burial honors of a head of state. Dignitaries from all over the world attended her funeral service. She was buried at the Capital Municipal Cemetery in Río Piedras, Puerto Rico.

== Honors ==
In both Puerto Rico and the United States, numerous public structures and avenues have been named in honor of Rincón de Gautier. There is a Felisa Rincón de Gautier Museum and a parking lot with the name of Doña Fela on Calle Recinto Sur in Old San Juan. In New York City, both the Felisa Rincón de Gautier Institute for Law & Public Policy in the Bronx and a public school (PS 376) in Brooklyn, New York, are named in her honor.

On May 29, 2014, the Legislative Assembly of Puerto Rico honored 12 illustrious women — including Rincón de Gautier — with plaques in the "La Plaza en Honor a la Mujer Puertorriqueña" (Plaza in Honor of Puerto Rican Women) in San Juan. According to the plaques the 12 women, who by virtue of their merits and legacies, stand out in the history of Puerto Rico.

In 2019, Felisa Rincón de Gautier was highlighted by MSNBC for her outstanding political and humanitarian accomplishments as a notable American. Rincón was also leading the renovation of San Juan's Municipal Hospital Complex eventually becoming the First Hospital in Puerto Rico to get full accreditation from the American hospital Association in 1960.

On March 14, 2019, The Puerto Rican Arts Alliance (PRAA) honored Felisa Rincón de Gautier with the Distinguished Woman award.

Dona Felisa received recognition from multiple governments such as France (Medal of Joan of Arc), Spain (Gold Medal of Honor), and Ecuador (Gold Medal of Honor).

Felisa Rincón de Gautier was also recognized as "Woman of the Americas" in 1954 by the Union of American women due to her contributions to American society.

== Ancestry ==
Ancestors of Felisa Rincón de Gautier

4. Francisco Rincón Martín; b. Salamanca, Spain
2. Enrique Rincón Plumey; b. Patillas, Puerto Rico
5. Esilda Plumey; b. Lares, Puerto Rico
1. Felisa Rincón Marrero de Gautier; b. Ceiba, Puerto Rico
6. José Rámon Marrero; b. San Juan, Puerto Rico
3. Rita Marrero Rivera; b. Ceiba, Puerto Rico
7. Felícitas Rivera

== See also ==
- List of mayors of San Juan, Puerto Rico
- List of Puerto Ricans
- History of women in Puerto Rico

Political offices
Preceded by Roberto Sánchez Vilella	Mayor of San Juan; 1947–1968	Succeeded by Carlos Romero Barceló
