= 1951 Puerto Rican Law 600 referendum =

Referendum

4 June 1951

Results
Choice	Votes	%
Yes	387,016	76.46%
No	119,169	23.54%

A referendum on (United States) Public Law 81-600, granting improved self-government, was held in Puerto Rico on 4 June 1951. It was approved by 76.5% of voters.

== Results ==
Choice	Votes	%
For	387,016	76.46
Against	119,169	23.54
Total	506,185	100.00
Source: Nohlen
