= Padilla (surname) =

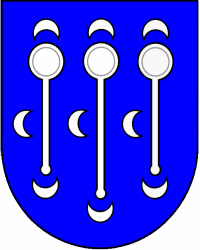
- Origin: Spain

Padilla (/pəˈdiːjə/ pə-DEE-yə) is a surname of Spanish origin. Notable people in various countries are listed herein.

- Multiple people named José Padilla

== Bolivia ==
- David Padilla (1927–2016), former president of Bolivia

== Colombia ==
- José Prudencio Padilla (1784–1828), Colombian military leader

== Cuba ==
- Heberto Padilla (1932–2000), Cuban poet

== France ==
- Lola Artôt de Padilla (born 1880), French-Spanish soprano

== Greenland ==
- Maligiaq Padilla (born 1982), Greenlandic kayaker

== Honduras ==
- Carlos Padilla Velásquez (1932–2014), Honduran footballer and manager

== Mexico ==
- Aarón Padilla (born 1977), footballer
- Ariel López Padilla (born 1962), actor
- Ezequiel Padilla Peñaloza (1890–1971), politician and diplomat
- Ignacio Padilla (1968–2016), writer
- Luis Padilla Nervo (1894–1985), politician and diplomat
- Raúl Padilla López (1954–2023), academic

== Nicaragua ==
- Vicente Padilla (born 1977), former Nicaraguan Major League Baseball pitcher

== Philippines ==
=== Part of the Padilla family ===
- Bela Padilla (born 1991), Filipino actress and model
- Daniel Padilla (born 1995), Filipino actor, singer and model
- Kylie Padilla (born 1993), Filipino actress and model
- Robin Padilla (born 1969), Filipino actor and Senator
- Rommel Padilla (born 1965), Filipino actor, movie producer and politician
- Zsa Zsa Padilla (born 1964), Filipino singer and actress
- Rustom Padilla (born 1967), Filipino-American actress, model, entertainer comedian, and director
- Roy Padilla Sr. (1926–1988), Filipino politician and actor
- Ricarte Padilla (born 1965), Filipino politician
- José Padilla Sr. (1888–1945), Filipino lawyer, politician and movie actor
- Carlos Padilla Sr. (1909–1964), Filipino Olympic boxer and actor
- Carlos Padilla Jr. (born 1934), Filipino boxing referee
- Consuelo Padilla Osorio (1907–1987), Filipino film director

=== Others ===
- Ambrosio Padilla (1910–1996), elected member of the Senate of the Philippines
- Dennis Padilla (born 1962), Filipino actor, comedian and politician
- Estela Padilla, a Filipina Catholic theologian
- Gino Padilla (born 1964), Filipino OPM singer and songwriter
- Nathaniel Padilla, Filipino sports shooter

== Puerto Rico ==
- Alejandro García Padilla (born 1971), Puerto Rican politician and attorney
- Hernán Padilla Ramírez (born 1938) is a retired Puerto Rican physician, elected without opposition as the first Hispanic president of the United States Conference of Mayors and former two-term Mayor of San Juan, Puerto Rico.
- Trina Padilla de Sanz (1894–1957), writer, storyteller, poet

== Spain ==
- Blanca Padilla (born 1995), Spanish fashion Model
- Jesús Padilla Gálvez (born 1959), Spanish philosopher
- José Padilla (Sánchez) (1889–1960), Spanish composer
- Juan Gutiérrez de Padilla (c.1590–1664), Spanish composer who lived in what is now Mexico
- Martín de Padilla y Manrique, 1st Count of Santa Gadea (1540–1602)
- María de Padilla (c.1334-1361), Queen of Castile; wife-mistress of King Peter I of Castile

== United States ==
- Aaron Padilla (artist) (born 1974), American artist and art educator
- Alex Padilla (born 1973), California Secretary of State and U.S. Senator
- Andrew Padilla, American singer
- Anthony Padilla (born 1987), American comedian and actor, and co-founder of the group Smosh
- Ashley Padilla (born 1993), American comedian and actress
- Craig Padilla, American ambient musician and film score composer, actor, and video producer
- Ernesto Padilla (born 1972), Cuban-American artist and cigarmaker
- Frederick M. Padilla (born 1959), 15th president of the National Defense University
- José Padilla (criminal) (born 1970), U.S. citizen held as enemy combatant and later convicted of having aided terrorists
- Leonard Padilla (born 1939), American bounty hunter
- Mike Padilla, American politician from Kansas
- Nicholas Padilla (born 1996), American baseball player
- Tanalís Padilla, Latin Americanist historian
- Vicente Padilla (born 1977), former Nicaraguan Major League Baseball pitcher
- Alex Padilla (American football) (born 2001), American football player
- Kevin Padilla (born 1976), American martial artist

== Fictional Characters ==
- Antonio “Tony” Padilla, a character in the novel and Netflix series, 13 Reasons Why
- Neron “Nero” Padilla, a character in the FX television series, Sons of Anarchy

== See also ==
- Padilha, the Portuguese-language variant
