= History of the Jews in Puerto Rico =

Puerto Rican Jews
Languages
- Spanish, English, Hebrew, Ladino

Religion
- Judaism

The history of the Jews in Puerto Rico dates back to the 1400s. Jewish immigration to Puerto Rico began in the 15th century with the arrival of the anusim (variously called conversos, Crypto-Jews, Secret Jews or marranos) who accompanied Christopher Columbus on his second voyage. An open Jewish community did not flourish in the colony because Judaism was prohibited by the Spanish Inquisition. However, many migrated to mountainous parts of the island, far from the central power of San Juan, and continued to self-identify as Jews and practice Crypto-Judaism.

It would be hundreds of years before an open Jewish community was established on the island. Very few American Jews settled in Puerto Rico after it was ceded by Spain to the United States under the terms of the 1898 Treaty of Paris, which ended the Spanish–American War.

The first large group of Jews to settle in Puerto Rico were refugees fleeing German–occupied Europe in the 1930s and 1940s. The second influx came in the 1950s, when thousands of Cuban Jews (most of Eastern-European descent) fled after Fidel Castro came to power. The majority immigrated to Miami, Florida, but a sizable portion chose to establish and integrate themselves on the neighboring island because of Puerto Rico's cultural, linguistic, racial, and historic similarities to Cuba.

Puerto Rican Jews have made many contributions in multiple fields, including business, commerce, education, and entertainment. Puerto Rico has the largest Jewish community in the Caribbean, with over 3,000 Jewish inhabitants. It is also the only Caribbean island in which all three major Jewish denominations—Orthodox, Conservative, and Reform—are represented.

== First Jews to arrive in Puerto Rico ==
According to historians, the first Jews to arrive in Puerto Rico were conversos, Jews who were forced to convert to Catholicism and were members of Christopher Columbus's crew during his second voyage to the so-called "New World", arriving in Puerto Rico on November 19, 1493. Historians believe that Luis de Torres, who spoke Hebrew among other languages and who accompanied Columbus as his interpreter, was the first "converso" Jew to set foot in Puerto Rico. The Jews who arrived and settled in Puerto Rico were referred to as "Crypto-Jews" or "secret Jews".

In 1478, the Catholic Monarchs of Spain, Ferdinand II of Aragon and Isabella I of Castile, established an ecclesiastical tribunal known as the Spanish Inquisition. It was intended to maintain Catholic orthodoxy in their kingdoms. Hundreds of Jews were killed, and their synagogues destroyed. One of the consequences of these disturbances was the mass forced conversion of Jews.

When the Crypto Jews arrived on the island of Puerto Rico, they were hoping to avoid religious scrutiny, but the Inquisition followed the colonists. The Inquisition maintained no rota or religious court in Puerto Rico. However, heretics were written up and if necessary remanded to regional Inquisitional tribunals in Spain or elsewhere in the Western Hemisphere. As a result, many secret Jews settled the island's remote mountainous interior far from the concentrated centers of power in San Juan and lived quiet lives. They practiced Crypto-Judaism which meant that they secretly practiced Judaism while publicly professing to be Roman Catholic. Still, since Jews were not permitted to worship, the Crypto Jews eventually intermarried with Catholics and therefore, Puerto Rico virtually had no Jewish history of which to speak.

== 19th century ==
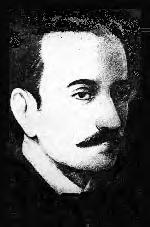
Mathias Brugman

By the 19th century, the Spanish Crown had lost most of its possessions in the Americas. Two of its remaining possessions were Puerto Rico and Cuba, both of which were demanding more autonomy and had pro-independence movements. The Spanish Crown issued the Royal Decree of Graces (Real Cédula de Gracias) which was originated August 10, 1815, with the intention of attracting European settlers who were not of Spanish origin to the islands.

The Spanish government, believing that the independence movements would lose their popularity, granted land and initially gave settlers "Letters of Domicile". However, those Europeans who were of the Jewish and Protestant faith were excluded from direct acquisition of state land since it was expected of the settlers to swear loyalty to the Spanish Crown and allegiance to the Roman Catholic Church. The opening of new lands to Catholics resulted in some sales of existing cultivated lands to others. This, however, did not keep people of Jewish descent from settling in Puerto Rico. Among the Puerto Rican Jews who lived in Puerto Rico in the 19th century was Mathias Brugman.

Mathias Brugman (1811–1868) was the son of Pierre Brugman from Curaçao of Dutch-Jewish ancestry and Isabel Duliebre from Puerto Rico. His parents met and married in New Orleans, Louisiana where Brugman was born, raised and educated. The Brugman family moved to Puerto Rico and settled in the City of Mayagüez where Brugman met and married Ana Maria Laborde. He opened a colmado (grocery store) and became rather successful, only to lose a good part of his fortune attempting to grow coffee. Like many other residents of Puerto Rico at the time, he resented the political injustices practiced by Spain on the island. This led him to become a believer in the cause of the Puerto Rican independence movement.

Brugman admired independence advocates Ramón Emeterio Betances and Segundo Ruiz Belvis. Together with his son, Hector, he joined them in a conspiracy to revolt against Spain and formed a revolutionary committee code named: "Capá Prieto" (a tree known as Spanish Elm, Ecuador Laurel, cypre or salmwood and used for its wood to build ships, among other things). On September 23, 1868, Brugman and his son participated in the short-lived revolt against Spanish rule known as El "Grito de Lares" (English: Cry of Lares). Brugman and his son refused to surrender to the Spanish authorities and eventually were executed.

After the failed revolution, the Spanish Courts passed the "Acta de Culto Condicionado" (Conditional Cult Act) in 1870. The law was an attempt to attract more settlers who would be faithful to the Spanish Crown by granting the right of religious freedom to all who wished to worship a religion other than Catholicism. Even so, the first synagogue was not established until after Puerto Rico was ceded by Spain to the United States at the end of the Spanish–American War in 1898. In the late 1800s during the Spanish–American War many Jewish American servicemen gathered together with local Puerto Rican Jews at the Old Telegraph building in Ponce to hold religious services. Rabbi Adolph Spiegel was among the servicemen who stayed in Puerto Rico. He led services from 1899 to 1905 in Ponce. Rabbi Spiegel played an instrumental role in the establishment of the first Jewish Synagogue in Ponce.

== 20th century ==
=== 1930s ===
Jewish-American soldiers were assigned to the military bases in Puerto Rico and many choose to stay and live on the island. Large numbers of Jewish immigrants began to arrive in Puerto Rico in the 1930s as refugees from Nazi occupied Europe. The majority settled in the island's capital, San Juan, where in 1942 they established the first Jewish Community Center of Puerto Rico.

=== 1940s ===
The President of the Puerto Rican Senate, Luis Muñoz Marín together with Governor Rexford Tugwell, the last non-Puerto Rican Governor of Puerto Rico appointed by an American president, helped advance legislation geared towards agricultural reform, economic recovery and industrialization. This program became known as Operation Bootstrap. As a result of the program, many Jews migrated to the city of Ponce located in the southern region of the island and worked in the agricultural industry. Operation Bootstrap also attracted clothing manufacturers from New York and many of the people in the industry who came to the island were Jews.

In 1942, President Franklin D. Roosevelt appointed Aaron Cecil Snyder (1907–1959), born in Baltimore, Maryland as Associate Justice of the Supreme Court of Puerto Rico. Snyder became the first Jew and the last non-Puerto Rican appointed to that court. In 1953, Governor Luis Muñoz Marín appointed him Chief Justice of the Supreme Court of Puerto Rico, the first appointment that a Puerto Rican governor made to the court, addressing the nomination to "A. Cecilio Snyder". Snyder actually used the name "Cecilio" when sworn in as Chief Justice. After his departure from the court, Snyder practiced law in San Juan until his death in 1959.

=== 1950s-1960s ===
In 1952, Puerto Rico achieved U.S. commonwealth status and officially became the Commonwealth of Puerto Rico (Spanish: "Estado Libre Asociado de Puerto Rico"). That same year a handful of American Jews established the island's first synagogue in the former residence of William Korber, a wealthy Puerto Rican of German descent, which was designed and built by Czech architect Antonin Nechodoma. The synagogue, called Sha'are Zedeck, hired its first rabbi in 1954.

After the success of the Cuban Revolution, led by Fidel Castro in 1959, almost all of Cuba's 15,000 Jews went into exile. The majority of them fled to Miami, Florida; however, Puerto Rico also received a large influx of Jewish emigres from Cuba.

Abe Fortas, who was an associate judge for the United States Supreme Court, and the son of Orthodox Jews, was a friend of Luis Muñoz Marin and frequented Puerto Rico often during Roosevelt's, Kennedy's, and Lyndon B. Johnson's administrations. He participated in the drafting of the Constitution of Puerto Rico and gave Luis Muñoz Marin and his administrators legal advice whenever called upon. According to Abe Fortas's biographer Laura Kalman, "Puerto Rico engaged Fortas. It became the one cause to which he was unconditionally committed."

== Establishment of a Jewish community ==
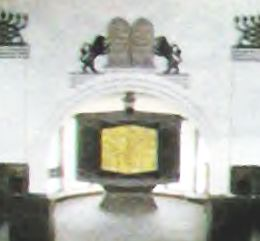
Inside Sha'are Zedeck

Puerto Rico is home to the largest and wealthiest Jewish community in the Caribbean with almost 3,000 Jewish inhabitants. Some Puerto Ricans have converted to Judaism, not only as individuals but as entire families. Puerto Rico is the only Caribbean island in which the Conservative, Reform and Orthodox Jewish movements are represented. Sha'are Zedeck, established in 1953, represents Conservative Judaism; Temple Beth Shalom, established in 1967, represents Reform Judaism; and Chabad Center, established in 1997, represents Orthodox Judaism.

The Reform congregation utilizes the English, Spanish, and Hebrew languages in their teachings, the Conservative congregation also uses English, Hebrew and Spanish. On November 30, 2005, the Puerto Rican Jewish community established their first synagogue outside of the Metropolitan San Juan area. The synagogue, which is located in the City of Mayagüez in the island's west coast, is called "Centro Hasidico Puertorriqueno Toiras Jesed". The Sha'are Zedeck, which has been designated by the Puerto Rican government as a National Historic Monument., and Reform congregations are located in San Juan and the Chabad Center is located in Isla Verde, in the city of Carolina. In the 1950s, the Puerto Rican musician Augusto Rodríguez, founder of the Choir of the University of Puerto Rico, founded the Hebrew Festival Chorus of San Juan's Jewish Community.

== Jewish influence in Puerto Rican and popular culture ==
The municipality of Yauco has a street with the word "Judio" (Jewish) in it. It is the “Calle Cuesta de los Judios” which in the English language means "Jewish Slope Street"

Puerto Rican Jews have made many contributions to the Puerto Rican way of life. Their contributions can be found, but are not limited to, the fields of education, commerce and entertainment. Among the many successful businesses which they have established are Supermercados Pueblo (Pueblo Supermarkets) founded by George and Harold Toppel, Almacenes Kress (clothing store), founded by Jorge Artime, Doral Bank, Pitusa and Me Salve, founded by Israel Kopel.

They have also made an impact in Puerto Rico's music industry. In 1970, Raphy Leavitt organized a band with an original sound and style that became one of Puerto Rico's greatest salsa orchestras, "La Selecta". He selected the band's repertoire from songs with a particular, positive social message and philosophy, and arranged his new band's sound to be as raw and powerful as the typical all-trombone salsa sound in vogue at the time. This genre was made popular by Willie Colón, but La Selecta featured the addition of trumpets to lighten up the sound melodically. Brenda K. Starr is a salsa singer who in 2002 won two Latin Grammy Awards, one for "Best Salsa Album", for "Temptation" and the other in the category "Best Salsa Single" for "Por Ese Hombre". In 2006, the Billboard Latin Music Awards nominated her for a "Best Salsa Single" award for "Tu Eres".

Puerto Rican literature has also been enriched with the works of Quiara Alegría Hudes who wrote the book for Broadway's musical In the Heights. Her play, 'Elliot, a Soldier's Fugue, was a Pulitzer Prize finalist in 2007.; author (history based fiction writer) the Ethiopian Yosef Alfredo Antonio Ben-Jochannan whose two better known works are "Black Man of the Nile" and "His Family and Africa: Mother of Major Western Religions"; author and poet Aurora Levins Morales with her work "Remedios: Stories of Earth and Iron from the History of Puertorriqueñas" and Micol Ostow, author of "Emily Goldberg Learns to Salsa"; and author Stephen Earley Jordan II's short story "The Jew of Condado" (2014). In July 2003, members and friends of Temple Beth Shalom published "What's Cooking/ Que se Cocina en Puerto Rico", a Spanish/English cookbook which includes Jewish recipes and Jewish holidays.

Among the notable people with Puerto Rican and Jewish roots are: Geraldo Rivera, David Blaine, Bruno Mars, Benjamin Agosto, Hila Levy, Ian Gomez, Leslie Kritzer, Julio Kaplan, Joaquin Phoenix, and Jenna Wolfe.

In the 2008 film Nothing Like the Holidays, actor John Leguizamo plays the role of Mauricio Rodriguez, a Puerto Rican whose wife Sarah (played by actress Debra Messing) is of the Jewish faith. In one scene of the film, the family discusses the fact that there are many Jewish Puerto Ricans and that in San Juan there is a large Jewish community.

== Resolution 1480 ==
On October 31, 2005, the Senate of Puerto Rico approved Senate Resolution 1480, recognizing the contributions which the Jewish community has made to the way of life of Puerto Rico and the friendship which exists between the peoples of Puerto Rico and Israel.

== See also ==
- List of Puerto Ricans
- Cultural diversity in Puerto Rico
  - Chinese immigration to Puerto Rico
  - Corsican immigration to Puerto Rico
  - French immigration to Puerto Rico
  - German immigration to Puerto Rico
  - Irish immigration to Puerto Rico
  - Royal Decree of Graces of 1815
  - Crypto-Judaism
- History of the Jews in Latin America
- History of the Jews in Latin America and the Caribbean
