= Francisco Ramírez Medina =

President of the Republic of Puerto Rico

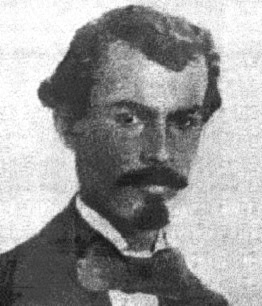

1st President of the Republic of Puerto Rico
- In office September 23, 1868 – September 23, 1868
- Preceded by: Office created
- Succeeded by: Office abolished

Personal details
- Born: Francisco Ramírez Medina; 1828 Aguada, Puerto Rico
- Died: Unknown
- Ramírez's authority was only recognized during the revolution. During which he made his only official proclamation and named an official cabinet.

Francisco Ramírez Medina (born c.1828), was one of the leaders of "El Grito de Lares", the first major revolt against Spanish rule and call for independence in Puerto Rico in 1868. He has thus far been the only person to be named "President of the Republic of Puerto Rico".

== El Grito de Lares (The Lares Uprising) ==
History has little to say about Ramírez Medina and his personal life; what is known however, is that he was a believer in the Puerto Rican independence movement. For years, various sectors in Puerto Rico had plans for claiming the independence of Puerto Rico from Spanish rule. Among those who planned for the island's freedom was Puerto Rican General Antonio Valero de Bernabé, who upon learning of Simón Bolívar's dream of liberating and creating a unified Latin America, which included Puerto Rico and Cuba, decided to join him and in St. Thomas established contacts with the Puerto Rican independence movement. However, it wasn't until 1868 when a revolt was initially started and planned by Ramón Emeterio Betances and Segundo Ruiz Belvis against the Government of Spain which then ruled the island. Manuel Rojas, Mariana Bracetti and Mathias Brugman joined them by forming revolutionary cells in the island. Ramírez Medina amongst others also joined the movement.

=== Planning stage ===
On September 20, Ramírez Medina held a meeting at his house in which the insurrection was planned and set to begin in Camuy on September 29. The meeting was attended by Marcelino Vega, Carlos Martínez, Bonifacio Agüero, José Antonio Hernández, Ramón Estrella, Bartolomé González, Cesilio López, Antonio Santiago, Manuel Ramírez, Ulises Cancela. Cancela instructed Manuel María González to deliver all of the acts and important papers in regard to the meeting to Manuel Rojas.

On the night of September 19 a Spanish captain stationed in Quebradillas, Juan Castañón, overheard two cell members commenting that on September 29 the troop at Camuy would be neutralized by poisoning the bread rations. Given the fact that September 29 would be a holiday for most laborers, simultaneous uprisings would occur, beginning with the cell in Camuy, and following with the ones in various other points; reinforcements would come in through a ship, "El Telégrafo", and the cells would be reinforced by more than 3,000 mercenaries. Castañón and his men then entered González's residence and confiscated the documents of Medina's meeting and alerted his commanding officer in Arecibo. The cell leaders at the Lanzador del Norte cell in Camuy were soon arrested. The rebels decided to move up the date of the revolution after the authorities on the island discovered the plan.

== Declaration of Independence ==
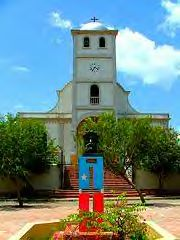
Roman Catholic Church of Lares and Monument to the Grito at the Plaza de la Revolución.

It was then agreed to first strike at the town of Lares on September 24. Some 400–600 rebels gathered on that day in the hacienda of Manuel Rojas, located in the vicinity of Peñuelas, on the outskirts of Lares. Poorly trained and armed, the rebels reached the town by horse and foot around midnight. They looted local stores and offices owned by "peninsulares" (Spanish-born men) and took over the city hall. Spanish merchants and local government authorities, considered by the rebels to be enemies of the fatherland, were taken as prisoners. The revolutionaries then entered the town's church and placed the revolutionary flag, the first Puerto Rican flag, knitted by Bracetti with the materials provided by Eduvigis Beauchamp Sterling, Treasurer of the revolution, on the High Altar. The flag was divided in the middle by a white Latin cross, the two lower corners were red and the two upper corners were blue. A white star was placed in the upper left blue corner. According to Puerto Rican poet Luis Lloréns Torres the white cross on it stand for the yearning for homeland redemption; the red squares, the blood poured by the heroes of the rebellion and the white star in the blue solitude square, stands for liberty and freedom. By placing the flag on the High Altar, the revolutionists were giving a sign that the revolution had begun. This event became known as "El Grito de Lares", Puerto Rico's call for independence. After this victory, Rojas and his men declared Puerto Rico a free Republic. The Republic of Puerto Rico was proclaimed at (2:00 am local time) under the presidency of Ramírez Medina at the church. President Ramírez Medina appointed Government officials as follows:

- Francisco Ramírez Medina, President
- Aurelio Méndez, Minister of the Interior
- Manuel Ramírez, Minister of State
- Celedonio Abril, Minister of the Treasury
- Federico Valencia, Minister of War
- Clemente Millán, Minister of Justice
- Bernabé Poll, Secretary to the President
- Manuel Rojas, Commander in Chief of the Liberation Army

As the President of provisional government of the Republic of Puerto Rico, Ramírez Medina first official act was the proclamation of the abolition of the Libreta system. The Libreta system, required that every worker carry on his person a notebook which stated the type of job the person does and who he works for. Anyone who was able to work and did not carry a "Libreta" (notebook or journal) was subject to imprisonment. He also ordered the liberation of all the slaves who joined the struggle or were prevented from doing so, and he urged his countrymen to do their duty and liberate Puerto Rico.

== Confrontation at San Sebastián ==
The rebel forces then departed to take over the next town, San Sebastián del Pepino. The Spanish militia, however, surprised the group with strong resistance, causing great confusion among the armed rebels who, led by Manuel Rojas, retreated back to Lares. Upon an order from the governor, Julián Pavía, the Spanish militia soon rounded up the rebels. All of the survivors were imprisoned in Arecibo. Francisco Ramírez Medina was among the captured and may have been executed for treason. His exact fate, however is unknown.

== Legacy ==
One of the bond certificates depicting Ramírez.

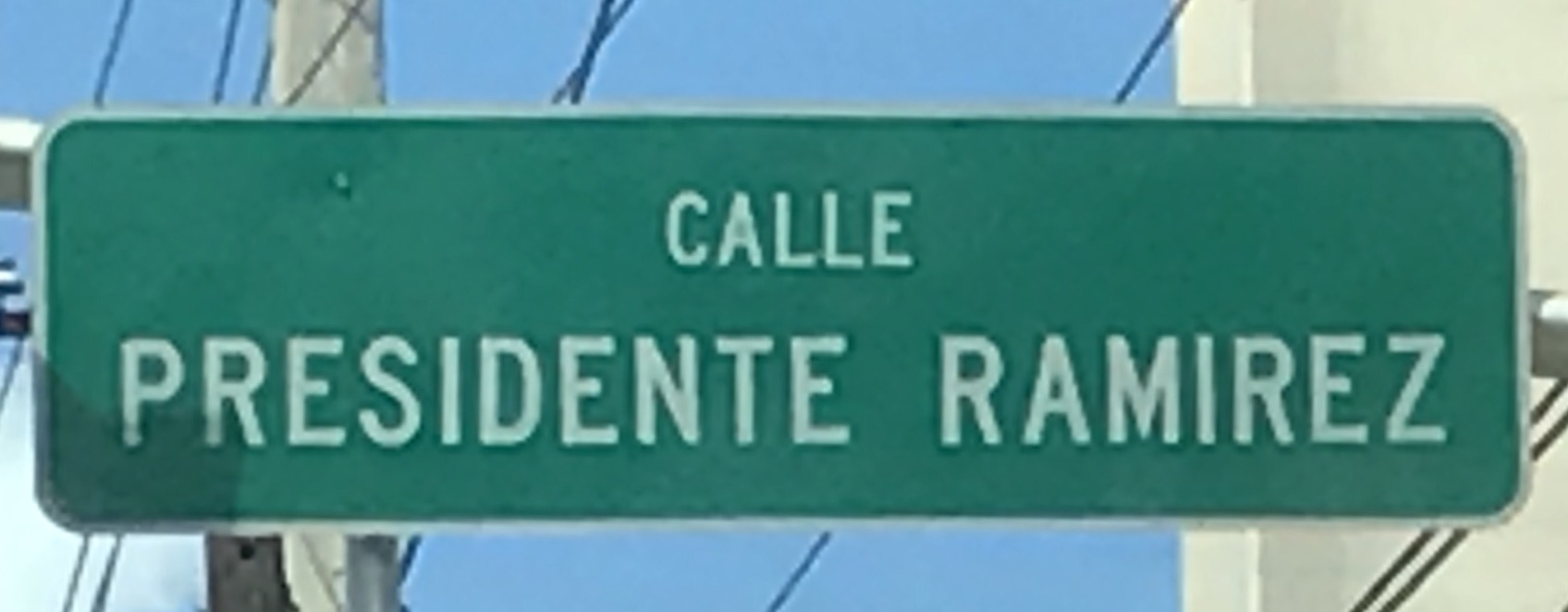
The street sign for Calle Presidente Ramírez.

On November 16, 1930, the Puerto Rican Nationalist Party issued bonds in the name of the "Republic of Puerto Rico" bearing the photograph of Dr. Ramírez "First President of the Republic". There is a street in Hato Rey, Puerto Rico, called Calle Presidente Ramírez (lit. "President Ramírez Street") in his honor. In addition it makes recognition of Ramírez Medina with a character in the play entitled "El Grito de Lares ... un momento en la historia." This work was written and has been run by the same author, Gerardo Lugo Segarra better known by his stage name as Jerry Segarra. The play was premiered on September 22, 2009 and since then uses the actual scenarios where they developed the Grito de Lares as were the Revolution Square, City Hall, the temple of the Catholic Church and the streets around the Plaza in Lares, Puerto Rico.

== See also ==
- List of Puerto Ricans
