= Padilha =

Padilha ([pɐˈðiʎɐ] or [paˈdʒiʎɐ]) is a Portuguese language surname. Notable people with the name include:

- Adriano Padilha Nascimento (born 1980), Brazilian footballer
- Alexandre Padilha (born 1971), Brazilian politician
- Eliseu Padilha (born 1945), Brazilian politician
- Janea Padilha, beautician, entrepreneur and author, best known for popularizing Brazilian bikini waxing
- Joel Bertoti Padilha (born 1980), Brazilian footballer
- José Padilha (born 1967), Brazilian film director, producer and screenwriter
- Marcos Danilo Padilha (1985–2016), Brazilian footballer
- Sylvio de Magalhães Padilha (1909–2002), Brazilian athlete
- Tarcísio Padilha, Brazilian philosopher

== See also ==
- Padilla (surname), Spanish-language variant
