= José Gualberto Padilla =

Puerto Rican poet, physician, journalist, and politician

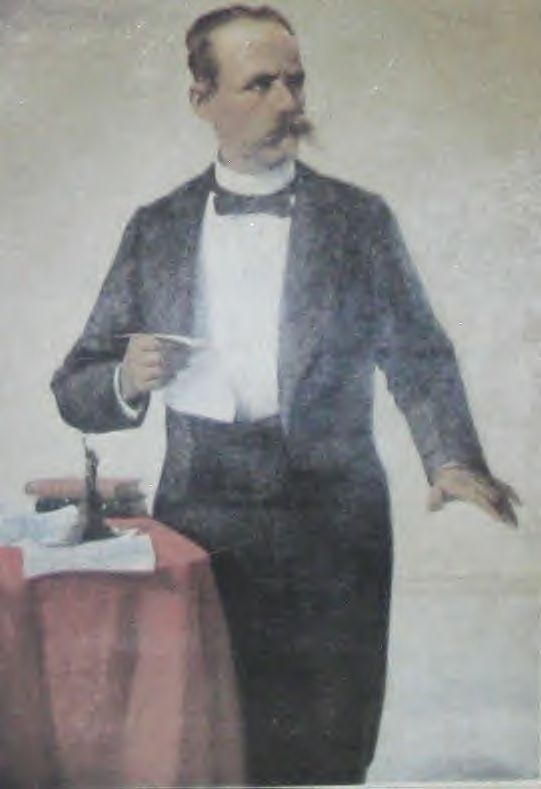
- Born: July 12, 1829; San Juan, Puerto Rico
- Died: May 26, 1896 (aged 66); Vega Baja, Puerto Rico
- Occupations: poet, physician, journalist, politician and Puerto Rico independence movement leader
- Children: 3

José Gualberto Padilla (July 12, 1829 – May 26, 1896), also known as El Caribe, was a physician, poet, journalist, politician, and advocate for Puerto Rico's independence. He suffered imprisonment and constant persecution by the Spanish Crown in Puerto Rico because his patriotic verses, social criticism and political ideals were considered a threat to Spanish Colonial rule of the island.

== Early years ==
Padilla was born in San Juan, the capital city of Puerto Rico to José María Padilla Córdova and Trinidad Alfonso Ramírez. The family moved to the town of Añasco, where Padilla's father practiced law. There he received his primary education, and continued his secondary education in Santiago de Compostela, Spain.

While studying in Spain, Padilla and a group of Puerto Ricans founded the newspaper La Esperanza, which criticized the political and social abuses in Puerto Rico by the Spanish colonial government. In 1845 he moved to Barcelona, Spain where he earned his medical degree. There he wrote for various local newspapers and published a satiric political poem titled Zoopoligrafía.

Padilla, together with Román Baldorioty de Castro, founded the Sociedad Económica de Amigos del País en Puerto Rico, the Puerto Rican chapter of the Sociedad Económica de los Amigos del País (Economic Society of Friends of Puerto Rico). This group was founded by the Spanish intelligentsia, with chapters in various cities throughout the "Enlightenment Spain" and, to a lesser degree, in some of her colonies.

== Return to Puerto Rico ==
In 1857, Padilla returned to Puerto Rico and settled in the town of Vega Baja. There he purchased an hacienda, a sugar plantation called Hacienda La Monserrate. The hacienda generated enough income, which permitted him to establish a clinic and practice medicine in the town. If a patient was poor or indigent, Padilla treated them free of charge. He also served two terms as Mayor of the town of Vega Baja. Padilla eventually abolished slavery in his hacienda.

== Revolutionary ==
Padilla helped organize the uprising against Spanish Colonial rule known as El Grito de Lares, which was the first major revolt against Spanish rule and call for independence in Puerto Rico. The short-lived revolt, planned by Ramón Emeterio Betances and Segundo Ruiz Belvis and carried out by various revolutionary cells in Puerto Rico, occurred on September 23, 1868, and began in the town of Lares, Puerto Rico.

Upon the failure of the revolt some 475 rebels - amongst them Padilla, Manuel Rojas and Mariana Bracetti - were imprisoned in Arecibo, where they were tortured and humiliated. Padilla continued to write poems during his confinement in prison. On November 17, a military court imposed the death penalty, for treason and sedition, on all the prisoners. Meanwhile, in Madrid, Eugenio María de Hostos and other prominent Puerto Ricans managed to intercede with President Francisco Serrano, who had himself just led a revolution against the monarchy in Spain.

In an effort to appease the already tense atmosphere on the island, the incoming governor José Laureano Sanz, announced a general amnesty early in 1869, and all the prisoners were released. Padilla returned to his home but Betances, Rojas and many other prisoners were not released to their Puerto Rican homeland. They were sent into exile.

== Written works ==
Upon returning home, in order to avoid re-arrest, Padilla wrote for various publications under the pseudonyms El Caribe, Macuquino, Cibuco and Trabuco. He also criticized the director of the newspaper El Duende, a Spaniard who looked down on local Puerto Rican customs and traditions. Padilla also feuded with Manuel del Palacio, a Spanish poet whose verses were offensive to the Puerto Rican people. In 1874, he published Para un Palacio un Caribe, in which he criticized Palacio.

In 1880, Padilla received an award for his poem Contra el Periodismo Personal from the newspaper El Buscapie, owned by Manuel Fernández Juncos. From 1886 to 1888, El Caribe wrote for the newspaper El Palenque de la Juventud. Amongst his important works are:

1. Nuevo Cancionero de Borinquen (1872)
2. El Indio Antillano
3. El Maestro Rafael (dedicated to the Puerto Rican educator Rafael Cordero)
4. En la muerte de Corchado (dedicated to Manuel Corchado y Juarbe)
5. Para un Palacio un Caribe (1874)

== Later years ==
Padilla retired in 1888 and lived the remaining years of his life at his estate in Vega Baja. He died on May 26, 1896, while working on his last poem Canto a Puerto Rico. before his death. This poem is considered Padilla's magnum opus. It has been said that, had he not died prematurely, Padilla's Canto a Puerto Rico would have rivaled the Cantar de Mio Cid for literary and historical significance. His remains were interred in Cementerio Municipal de Vega Baja.

== Legacy ==
Various towns in Puerto Rico have schools named after Padilla. The towns with schools named José Gualberto Padilla are Cayey, Arecibo and Vega Baja

His daughter, Trinidad Padilla de Sanz (1864–1957), was a poet who assumed the pseudonym, La Hija del Caribe ("Daughter of El Caribe"). In 1912, she collected most of Padilla's poetic works and published them in two books: En el Combate ("In Combat") and Rosas de Pasión ("Roses of Passion") through Librería Paul Ollendorff in Paris.

== See also ==
- List of Puerto Ricans
- El Grito de Lares
- List of Puerto Rican writers
