= Juan Ríus Rivera =

Puerto Rican who reached the highest military rank in the Cuban Liberation Army

Juan Rius Rivera
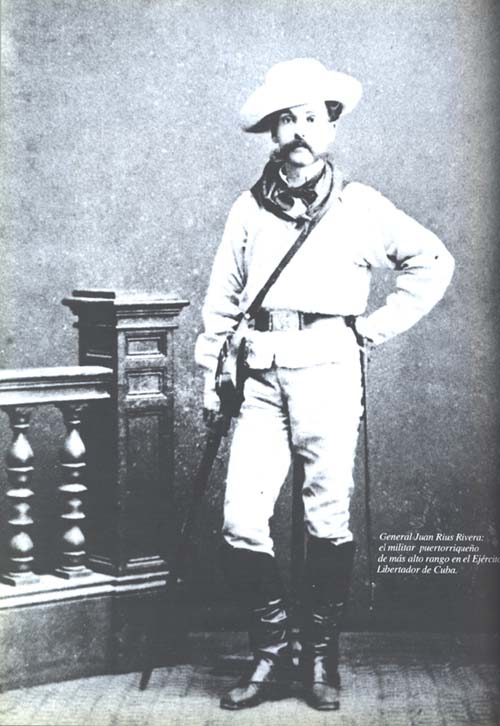
- Major General Juan Rius Rivera
- Born: August 26, 1848; Mayagüez, Captaincy General of Puerto Rico
- Died: September 20, 1924 (aged 76); Honduras
- Military career
- Allegiance: Cuban Liberation Army
- Service years: 1869–1898
- Rank: Major General
- Commands: General-in-Chief of the Cuban Liberation Army of the West
- Conflicts: Ten Years' War; Cuban War of Independence

Major General Juan Rius Rivera (August 26, 1848 – September 20, 1924), was a soldier and revolutionary leader from Puerto Rico who served in the Cuban Liberation Army and reached the highest military rank in the army. He held Cuban ministerial offices after independence and in his later years he also became a successful businessperson in Honduras.

== Early years ==
Rius Rivera was born in Mayagüez, Puerto Rico, to Eusebio Rius from Catalonia and Ramona Rivera from Puerto Rico. He was one of nine brothers. His paternal grandparents were Vicente Ríus and Francisca Rubio. His maternal grandparents were José Eusebio de Jesús de Rivera from Galicia, Spain and María Manuela de Rivera from Mayagüez. His family owned a coffee plantation in the Río Cañas Abajo barrio in Mayagüez, and were one of the wealthiest families in that town. There he received both his primary and secondary education. Rius Rivera was sent by his parents to study in Spain and earned his bachelor's degree in Barcelona. He then went to study law at the University of Madrid, but he did not graduate. As a young man, he met and befriended the Puerto Rican patriot Ramón Emeterio Betances. Convinced that the Spanish Crown was mistreating the people of Puerto Rico and inspired by the ideals of Betances, Rius Rivera joined the pro-independence movement on the island. He became a member of the Mayagüez revolutionary cell "Capá Prieto" under the command of Mathias Brugman.

== Cuban Liberation Army ==
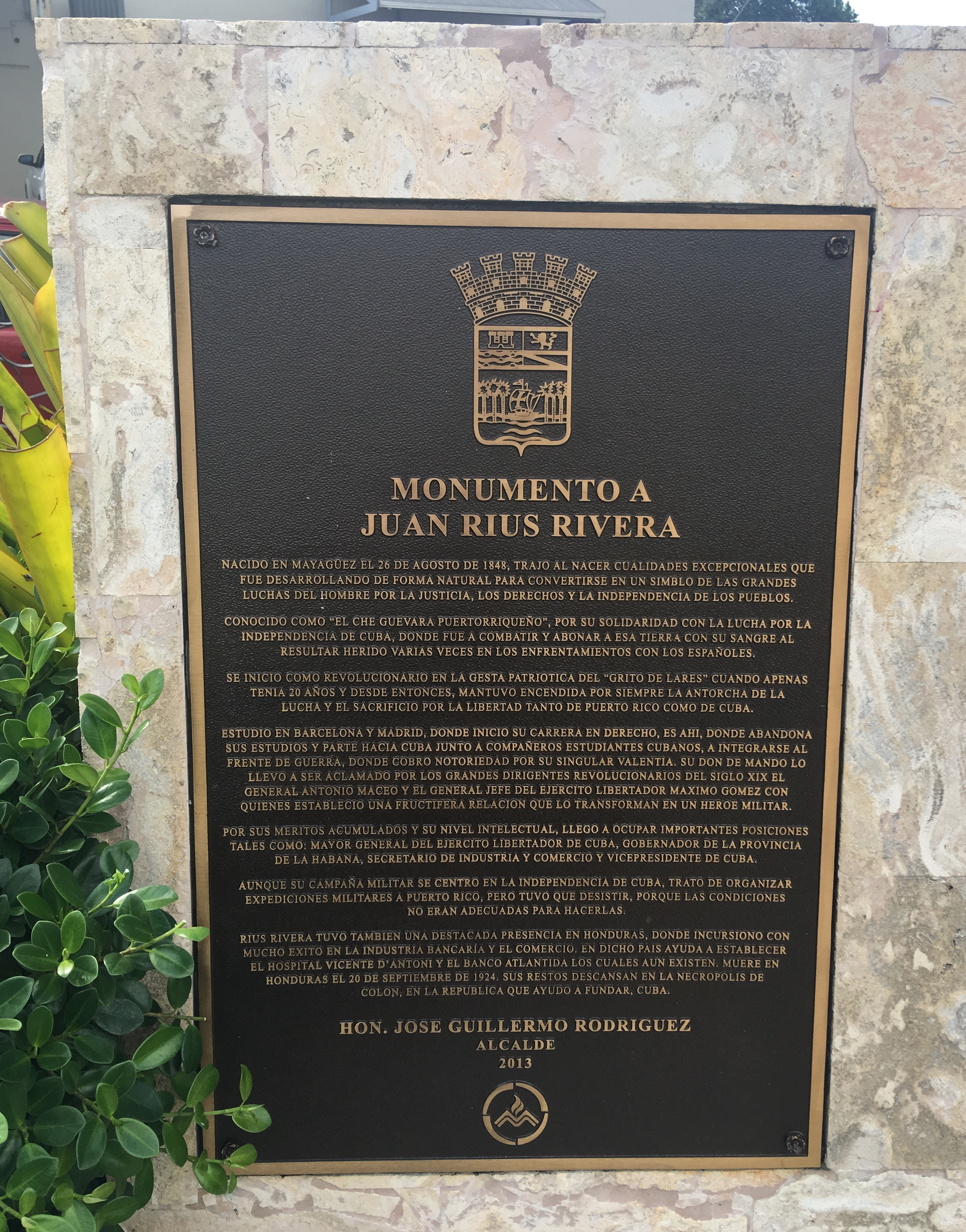
Placard in honor of Juan Ríus Rivera in Mayagüez, PR.

On September 23, 1868, a group of Puerto Ricans revolted against Spain in an event known as the Grito de Lares (The Cry of Lares). Many of the revolutionaries were either killed, imprisoned or exiled. Rius Rivera, who had not participated directly in the revolt, was an avid reader of information pertaining to the Antilles and learned about the failed revolt. He then set his hopes on Cuba. Rius Rivera interrupted his studies in Spain, crossed the border to France, and from there he traveled to the United States. He arrived in New York City in 1869 and went to the Cuban Revolutionary Junta and offered his services. In December 1869, Colonel Francisco Javier Cisneros advised Rius to be ready to set sail for Cuba and a few days later the mayagüezano (as the people from Mayagüez are known) sailed for Cuba aboard the "Anna", an American steamship. There he participated in that country's Ten Years' War (1868–78) against Spain. In 1870 he joined the forces of Calixto García and was wounded in the Battle of Las Villas while fighting under the command of General Máximo Gómez. The Ten Years' War came to an end with the Treaty of Zanjón, which resulted in the granting of more autonomous powers to Cuba.

Rius Rivera did not agree with the treaty, and moved to Trujillo, Honduras in 1884. In 1887, he married a native Honduran named Aurora, the sister of Tomás Estrada Palma, future president of Cuba. In Honduras he dedicated himself to commerce and prospered economically. The Spanish Crown did not keep its part of the treaty with Cuba, and on February 24, 1895, insurgents rose against the Spaniards in the provinces of Oriente, Santa Clara and Matanzas in what became known as "El Grito de Baire". Rius Rivera joined the Cuban Liberation Army as one of its generals.

The Commander-in-Chief of the Cuban Liberation Army of the West, General Antonio Maceo, was wounded and surrounded in a place called "La Trocha". In September 1897, Rius Rivera under General Enrique Collazo was sent with Cuban troops aboard the schooner Three Friends to rescue General Maceo. They were able to break through the Spanish blockade and reach General Maceo. On December 7, General Maceo was engaged in a fierce fight against the troops of Spanish Major Cirujedas when he was killed. On December 20, General Rius Rivera was promoted to Commander-in Chief of the West at General Maceo's request.

In 1897, Antonio Mattei Lluberas, a wealthy coffee plantation owner from Yauco, visited the Puerto Rican Revolutionary Committee in New York City. There he met with Ramón Emeterio Betances, Juan de Mata Terreforte and Aurelio Méndez Martínez and together they proceeded to plan a major coup. The uprising, which became known as the Intentona de Yauco was to be directed by Betances, organized by Aurelio Méndez Mercado and the armed forces were to be commanded by General Juan Rius Rivera from Cuba. On March 28, 1897, Rius Rivera engaged in combat at Cabezedas in the Occidental Province, where he was then overpowered by Spanish General Hernández Velasco. He and 250 of his men were captured and imprisoned. General Juan Rius Rivera was gravely injured and was transported to the hospital of San Ambrosio in Havana. Later, he was deported to Castillo Presidio de Montjuïc in Barcelona, Spain where he remained until the end of the war. On February 15, 1898, the United States declared war against Spain in what is known as the Spanish–American War. On April 19, 1898, the U.S. Congress passed a resolution recognizing Cuba as a "free and independent" nation. Spain surrendered and signed the Treaty of Paris on December 10, resulting in Puerto Rico becoming a U.S. territory. Cuba gained its independence in 1902, but remained under heavy American influence until the communist revolution of Fidel Castro in 1959.

== Political career ==
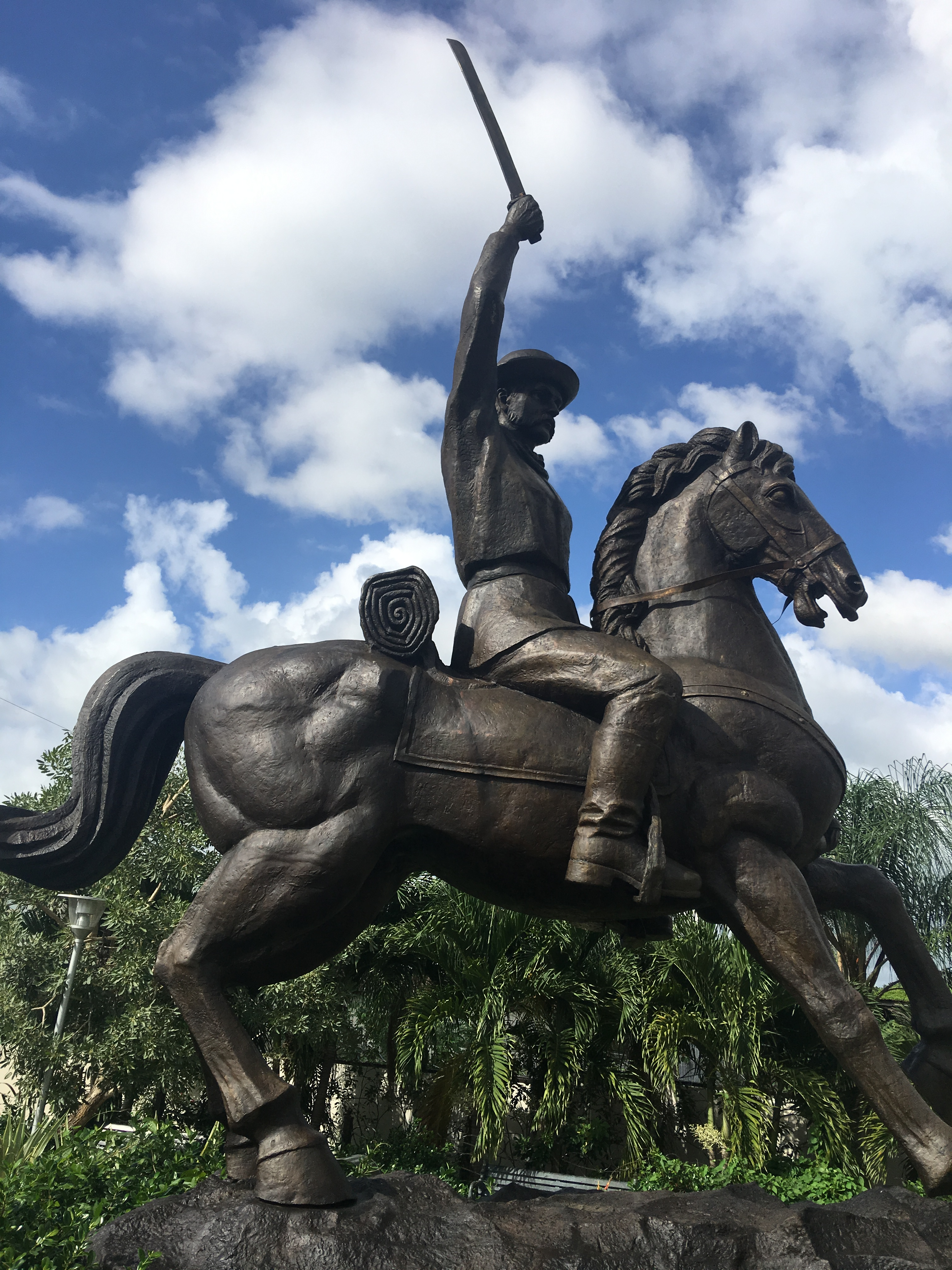
Statue of Juan Ríus Rivera in Mayagüez, PR

General Rius Rivera was soon active in the young nation's politics. Among the political positions which he held were:

- Member of the Assembly of Pinar del Río
- Secretary of the President of the Republic
- Civil Governor of Havana, named by General John E. Brooke
- Secretary of Agriculture, named by General Leonardo Wood

General Rius Rivera was one of the few members of the Cuban Assembly (legislature) who rejected the imposition of the Platt Amendment, which gave the United States the right to intervene unilaterally in Cuba as a precondition for independence in 1902.

In 1902, Tomás Estrada Palma was elected president of Cuba. He, in turn, named Rius Rivera Secretary of the Treasury of Cuba in May 1902. When Estrada Palma's government fell he chose not to join the new government even though he was offered a position. In May 1907, Rius Rivera returned to Honduras, homeland of his wife. There he founded and was president of the Banco Atlántico and first president of Hospital D'Antonio.

Rius Rivera was representing Cuba at a conference held in Honduras in 1924 when he suddenly died of heart failure. His remains were returned to Cuba and he is buried in the Colón Cemetery located in Havana, Cuba.,

== Monument in Mayagüez, PR ==
In 2013, the township of Mayagüez unveiled an equestrian statue of Ríus Rivera on a little park to the side of the Balboa Bridge. The cast, made by the Puerto Rican artist, Salvador Rivera Cardona, presents the patriot from Mayagüez in Cuba in his role of a military leader with the machete held high. The site has attracted tourists and history fans.

== Brigade ==
There is a "brigade" named after Juan Ríus Rivera.

== Honors ==
The National Patriotic Union of Cuba (UNPACU) named its newly founded Puerto Rico chapter after Rius during a visit by the organization's leader José Daniel Ferrer in May 2016.

== See also ==
- Military history of Puerto Rico
- List of Puerto Ricans
- List of Puerto Rican military personnel
- José Semidei Rodríguez
- Francisco Gonzalo Marín
