= José Padilla =

José Padilla is the name of:

- José Gualberto Padilla (1829–1896), Puerto Rican poet, politician and advocate of Puerto Rican independence
- José Prudencio Padilla (1784–1828), Colombian military leader
- José Trinidad Padilla (born 1957), Mexican IRP politician
- José Padilla (composer) (1889–1960), "Maestro Padilla", Spanish composer
- José Padilla Sr. (1888–1945), Filipino politician and actor
- José Padilla Jr. (1911–1978), Filipino actor & boxer
- José Padilla (born 1950), U.S.-resident Honduran in the Padilla v. Kentucky case
- José Padilla (DJ) (1955–2020), Spanish DJ
- José Padilla (criminal) (born 1970), United States citizen convicted of aiding terrorists
- José Padilla (academic administrator), president of Valparaiso University beginning 2021
- José Padilla (footballer) (born 1999), Mexican footballer

== See also ==
- José Padilha (born 1967), Brazilian film director, producer and writer
- Juan José Padilla (born 1973), Spanish torero ('bullfighter')
