= Manuel Corchado y Juarbe =

Puerto Rican activist (1840–1884)

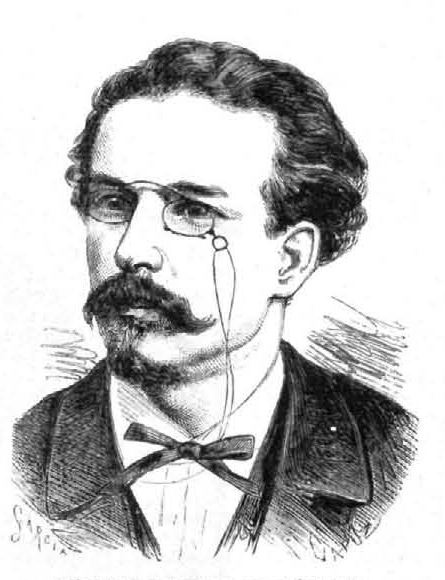
- La Ilustración Española y Americana, November 5, 1871
- Born: September 12, 1840; Isabela, Puerto Rico
- Died: November 30, 1884 (aged 44); Madrid, Spain
- Occupations: poet, journalist and politician

Manuel Corchado y Juarbe (September 12, 1840 – November 30, 1884) was a Puerto Rican poet, journalist and politician who defended the abolition of slavery and the establishment of a university in Puerto Rico. Through his written works he criticized the way the people of Puerto Rico were being treated by the island's Spanish-appointed governor.

== Early years ==
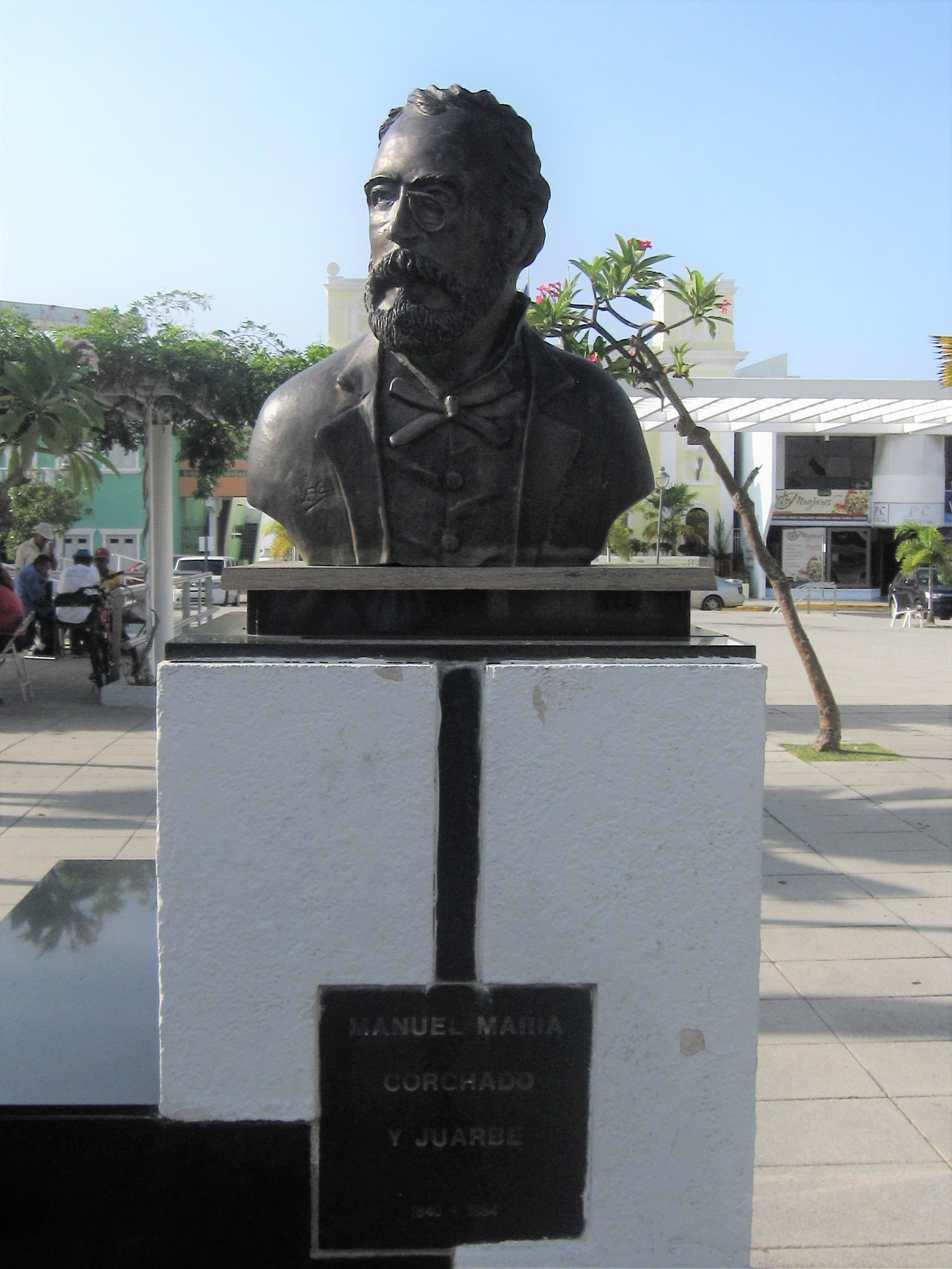
Manuel Maria Corchado y Juarbe bust in Isabela barrio-pueblo

Corchado y Juarbe was born in Arenales Altos, a barrio in the town of Isabela in Puerto Rico. His parents were Juan Eugenio Corchado and Juana Eugenia Juarbe. He received his primary education in the towns of Isabela and Aguadilla. In 1855, his parents sent him to Barcelona, Spain, where he received and finished his secondary education. Corchado y Juarbe later earned a law degree from the University of Barcelona.

While living in Barcelona, Corchado y Juarbe, together with José Coll y Britapaja, a fellow Puerto Rican, founded a magazine called "Las Antillas". He used the magazine to make public the social problems in Puerto Rico and what the people of the island were going through. He championed the idea of the establishment of a university and the abolition of slavery. Corchado y Juarbe also criticized and told of the abuses of Lieutenant General Féliz María de Messina Iglesias, the Spanish-appointed governor in the island.

== Return to Puerto Rico ==
Corchado y Juarbe returned to Puerto Rico and began a column in the newspaper "El Agente". In 1862, he entered a contest sponsored by the Sociedad Económica de Amigos del País de Puerto Rico (the Economic Society of Friends of the Country of Puerto Rico). The "Sociedad Económica de Amigos del País de Puerto Rico" was a branch of the "Sociedad Económica de los Amigos del País", and these were private associations established in various cities throughout Spain and, to a lesser degree, in some of her colonies. In the contest, Corchado y Juarbe won first prize for his poem "Oda a Campeche". His poem was published in various Spanish newspapers and magazines. Corchado y Juarbe also presided over the Ateneo Puertorriqueño (Puerto Rican Athenaeum) for some time.

== Spanish Courts ==
Corchado y Juarbe was a supporter of the Spanish Revolución of 1868, believing that the Spanish colonies will enjoy more liberties with the establishment of the new regime. In 1871, after the success of the revolution, which established a republican government, he was elected to represent the municipality of Mayagüez and Puerto Rico before the Spanish Courts in Barcelona. Corchado y Juarbe made use of his position to denounce the use of capital punishment and voice his support of the new Spanish Constitution. He also delivered speeches in which he favored the improvement of social and economic conditions for the Spanish colonies. In 1875, the Spanish royal family returned to power and Corchado y Juarbe decided that it was too dangerous to continue in his political quest. In 1879, he returned to Puerto Rico.

In 1881, he moved to the city of Ponce because of health problems and continued writing for "El Agente" where he expressed his views. He then became a member of the new Reformist Party and ran for the position of representative to the Spanish Courts for said party. He was elected to represent the municipality of Aguadilla and returned to Spain.

Corchado y Juarbe enemies because of his views and was accused of electoral fraud. He defended the legality of his election to represent Puerto Rico before the Spanish Courts to no avail. Corchado y Juarbe returned to Madrid and was challenged to a gun duel. He accepted the challenge and on November 30, 1884, died of the wounds received. Moments before he died, he told his wife the following:

Tell them my name, that I accomplished the mission of sacrificing my life for my country.

== Legacy ==
Corchado y Juarbe's body was buried in Madrid. In 1935, a committee of local citizens was formed to return his body to Isabela and to crear a monument to honor his memory and life. As a result, in 1993, his remains were transferred from Madrid to Isabela and interred in the local cemetery.

Puerto Rican poet José Gualberto Padilla dedicated a poem to the memory of Corchado y Juarbe titled "En la muerte de Corchado". A school, a street and the city square in his hometown, Isabela are named after him. On July 17, 1998, the Puerto Rican Legislature passed and approved Law 132 which designates the week beginning September 12 as "Manuel Corchado y Juarbe week".

== Written works ==
Among Corchado y Juarbe's written works are the following:

1. "Biografía de Lincoln" (Abraham Lincoln)
2. "Historia de Ultratumba"
3. "Oda a Campeche" (Jose Campeche)
4. "Las Barricadas".

== See also ==
- List of Puerto Ricans
- List of Puerto Rican writers
