= Francisco Gonzalo Marín =

Puerto Rican military officer

- Born: March 12, 1863; Arecibo, Puerto Rico
- Died: November 1897 (aged 34); Cuba
- Military career
- Allegiance: Cuban Liberation Army
- Service years: 1895–1897
- Rank: Lieutenant
- Nickname: Pachín Marín
- Conflicts: Cuban War of Independence

Lieutenant Francisco Gonzalo Marín, also known as Pachín Marín (March 12, 1863 – November 1897), was a poet and journalist who fought alongside José Martí as a member of the Cuban Liberation Army. He is among those who are said to have designed the Puerto Rican flag.

== Early years ==
Marín (birth name: Francisco Gonzalo Marín Shaw) was one of six siblings born to Santiago Marín Solá and Celestina Shaw Figuero in Arecibo, Puerto Rico, the town in which he received both his primary and secondary education. It was a period in history when the last two remaining Spanish colonies in the Antilles, Puerto Rico and Cuba, were demanding either more autonomy or full independence. Marín entered a seminary, but was unable to finish his studies because his family could not economically afford it. Marín went to work with the intention of helping his family and became a typesetter by trade. At the age of twenty, he founded a newspaper called El Postilion, which supported the independence cause and openly advocated his ideas. Marín expressed love for his country in his poems and in his newspaper. In 1884, he published his first book of poems titled Flores nacientes (Newborn Flowers) and followed with Mi óbolo in 1887, which contained the poems "Mis dos cultos" (My two cults), "A la asamblea" (To the Assembly) and "Al sol" (To the Sun). He had an older brother, Wenceslao Marín, whom he admired and with whom he shared his ideals.

Marín's brother enlisted in the Cuban Liberation Army which was fighting the Spanish Crown and was given the rank of lieutenant. In the meantime, Marín was the victim of political persecution by the Spanish government in the island and went into exile to the Dominican Republic in 1889. During his stay, he criticized the actions of Ulises Hereaux, the president of the republic, and he found himself once again in exile. In 1890, he went to live in Venezuela. In Caracas he was hired by "El siglo de Caracas" (the Century of Caracas) publishing house and he published various poems, among them "Emilia". However, it wasn't long before he entered into another conflict, this time with the Venezuelan head of state Raimundo Andueza Palacio and was once more exiled, this time to the island of Martinique.

== Design of the Puerto Rican flag ==
Flag of Puerto Rico (1895–1952)

In 1890, Marín returned to Puerto Rico for a short period and in 1891, he immigrated to Boston, Massachusetts. In 1892, Marín received the tragic news that his brother Lt. Wencenlao Marín had perished in the Battle of Manigua in Cuba. This motivated Marín to travel to New York City and enlist in the Cuban Liberation Army. The New York headquarters of the Cuban Army was situated in the New York offices of the Cuban Revolutionary Party. The person registering the volunteers when Marín went to enlist was José Martí. The meeting of the two was the beginning of a friendship which was cut short by the death of Martí in 1895. During his stay in the city, he collaborated in the La Gaceta del Pueblo a separatist newspaper which published the narrative "New York from Within". Marín is credited with designing the Puerto Rican flag. He used the Cuban flag as a model and inverted the colors in the flag's triangle and stripes. He presented the flag in New York's "Chimney Corner Hall", a gathering place of independence advocates. The flag soon came to symbolize the ideals of the Puerto Rican independence movement. Some people believe that Manuel Besosa was the designer, based on a letter written by his daughter in which she says, "...my father asked me to sew together some pieces of cloth, white, red and blue that he brought himself, this tiny flag had 5 alterned stripes, red and white, and a triangle with a five point star within it...". However, there is a letter written by Juan de Mata Terreforte, vice-president of the Revolutionary Committee of Puerto Rico, a chapter of the Cuban Revolutionary Party, which clearly gives credit to Marín. The original contents of the letter in Spanish are the following:

"La adopción de la bandera cubana con los colores invertidos me fue sugerida por el insigne patriota Francisco Gonzalo Marín en una carta que me escribió desde Jamaica. Yo hice la proposición a los patriotas puertorriqueños que asistieron al mitin de Chimney Hall y fue aprobada unánimemente."

which, translated in English, states the following:

The adaptation of the Cuban flag with the colors inverted was suggested by the patriot Francisco Gonzalo Marín in a letter which he wrote from Jamaica. I made the proposition to various Puerto Rican patriots during a meeting at Chimney Hall and it was approved unanimously.

However, it may never be truly known who designed the flag. According to some accounts on June 12, 1892, Antonio Vélez Alvarado was at his apartment at 219 23rd Street in Manhattan, New York when he stared at a Cuban flag for a few minutes, and then took a look at the blank wall in which it was being displayed. Vélez Alvarado suddenly perceived an optical illusion, in which he perceived the image of the Cuban flag with the colors in the flag's triangle and stripes inverted. Almost immediately he visited a nearby merchant, Domingo Peraza, from whom he bought some crepe paper to build a crude prototype. He later displayed his prototype in a dinner meeting at his neighbor's house, where the owner, Micaela Dalmau vda. de Carreras, had invited José Martí as a guest. Martí was pleasantly impressed by the prototype, and made note of it in a newspaper article published in the Cuban revolutionary newspaper Patria, published on July 2 of that year. Acceptance of the prototype was slow in coming, but grew with time.

Also, in a letter written by Maria Manuela (Mima) Besosa, the daughter of the Puerto Rican Revolutionary Committee member Manuel Besosa, she stated that she sewed the flag. This created a belief that her father could have been its designer.

== Cuban Liberation Army ==
Soon, Marín was fighting in Cuba where he was given the rank of lieutenant. Marín was wounded after he and his men confronted the Spanish Army in a skirmish in Turiguanó. Believing that he would be a burden to his men, he refused to be treated and was placed on a hammock. In November 1897, Lt. Francisco Gonzalo Marín died and when his men returned they buried his remains. his brother Wenceslao also died fighting in Cuba.

== Poetic works ==
Among his poetic works are:

- Flores Nacientes (Born Flowers) -1884
- Mi Óbolo-1887
- Romances-1892
- En el barco (A mi Madre) (In the boat) -1894
- El Trapo (The Flag) -1896
- En la arena (On the sand), Obra Poética (Poetic Work) and Antología De Pachín Marín, were published posthumously in 1898.
- El trapo (The cloth) - The following are the verses of Marin's "El trapo":

Spanish (original version)	English translation
Cuando un pueblo no tiene una bandera, bandera libre que enarbole ufano,. en pos de su derecho soberano y el patrimonio, la gentil quimera;	When a people does not have a flag, a free flag that it may raise proud, while seeking its sovereign right and the patrimony, a gentle chimera;
si al timbre de su gloria entera bríos de combate en contra del tirano, la altiva dignidad del ciudadano o el valor instintivo de la fiera;	if to the sound of its entire glory vigor of battle against the tyrant, the arrogant dignity of the citizen or the instinctive value of the wild animal;
con fe gigante y singular arrojo láncese al campo del honor fecundo, tome un lienzo, al azar, pálido o rojo,	with singular and gigantic faith may it charge the field of fertile honor, take a cloth at random, pale or red,
y, al teñirlo con sangre el iracundo verá cambiarse el mísero despojoe en un trapo que asombre a todo el mundo.	And, upon staining it with blood the irate one will see the wretched spoil transformed into a rag that will amaze everyone.

== Postscript ==
The Puerto Rican flag designed by Marín was approved by the Government of Puerto Rico on July 24, 1952, making it the official flag of Puerto Rico. However, the flag adopted by the government was slightly different. Instead of a light blue triangle, preferred by the independence movement, the government approved a dark blue triangle similar to the blue used in the flag of the United States. The city of Arecibo named an avenue in his honor.

== See also ==
- Military history of Puerto Rico
- List of Puerto Ricans
- List of Puerto Rican military personnel
- List of Puerto Rican writers
- Puerto Rican literature
- José Semidei Rodríguez
- Juan Ríus Rivera
