= Raphy Leavitt =

Puerto Rican musician (1948–2015)

- Born: September 17, 1948; San Juan, Puerto Rico
- Died: August 5, 2015 (aged 66) Miami, Florida, U.S.
- Genres: Salsa
- Occupations: Composer and founder of the salsa orchestra, La Selecta

Raphy Leavitt (September 17, 1948 – August 5, 2015) was a Puerto Rican composer and founder of the salsa orchestra, La Selecta.

== Early years ==
Rafael Angel Leavitt Rey, born in San Juan, Puerto Rico, was the second of four siblings in his family, José Manuel, Rafael Ángel, Lillian Rose and Jorge Luis, and was born to a Jewish father and a Catholic mother. He and his siblings became orphans at an early age and were raised by their aunt in the Puerta de Tierra section of San Juan. Leavitt was able to attend a private school, Colegio San Agustín, where he received his primary and secondary education.

During his childhood, he was also able to take classes at The Academy of Accordions. He participated in an accordion orchestra and was named "premier" accordionist. Leavitt enrolled in the University of Puerto Rico to study Business Administration. It was during this period of his life that he debuted as a professional musician, when he joined two cousins who shared Rey as last name to form the "Combo Los Rey". After four years in the university, Leavitt earned his bachelor's degree in business administration and graduated with high honors.

== La Selecta ==
External audio
- You may listen to Raphy Leavitt and La Selecta interpret Siempre Alegre on YouTube.

In 1966, Leavitt organized an orchestra which he named "Los Señoriales". This was the first time that he assumed the role of orchestra director. Later on, he renamed the orchestra "La Banda Latina" (Latin Band).

In 1970, Leavitt organized an orchestra which was to have a different sound and style. He wanted to select the band's repertoire from songs with a particular, positive social message and philosophy, and arranged his new band's sound as to sound as raw and powerful as the typical all-trombone salsa sound in vogue at the time (made popular by Willie Colón), but with the addition of trumpets to lighten up the sound melodically. He composed some of the songs of this new group, which he named "La Selecta". Ever since its beginning, La Selecta has featured Coamo-born Sammy Marrero, considered by many as a gentlemanly character in salsa, as one of its singers. Marrero, who has always been strongly influenced by jibaro music, had a chance to show his dramatic singing style in early hits such as the anthemic "Jíbaro Soy", a patriotic Puerto Rican song unusual for the times, "Payaso", and "El Buen Pastor". However, it is the band's signature song, "La Cuna Blanca", that Marrero's voice is mostly associated with.

== Van accident ==
On their way to a dance in Connecticut on October 28, 1972, the band's van had an accident, killing trumpet player Luis Maisonet and severely injuring Leavitt. Leavitt was in a coma, he sustained several fractures in his hip (he walked with a limp ever since), vertebrae and ribs in the accident, and was placed on intensive care. After he recovered from the coma, he had a persistent vision of an empty white crib, from which baby cries could be heard. Somehow he associated the vision with his trumpet player, unaware that he had died in the accident. Maisonet was reportedly dressed in black, and telling him: "Raphy, I'll help you from here". When fellow band members mustered the will to tell Leavitt about the player's death, Leavitt claimed that he already knew about it. After seven months of recovery, Leavitt and his band recorded the "La Cuna Blanca" as a tribute song, with Leavitt writing dramatic lyrics interpreted by Marrero, arranged to an upbeat, heavily contrasting cha-cha-cha beat. The bittersweet feeling evoked by the song has made it a popular farewell song at Puerto Rican funerals. Marrero's daughter's death from a stray bullet at a reggaeton club in 2005 brought the song back to light in the collective Puerto Rican conscience, and had the dramatic consequence of having Marrero sing it in a tribute concert to La Selecta the day immediately after her death.

In 1978, he discovered the young singer Tony Vega, who was to become a notable salsa singer. Leavitt and La Selecta were responsible for the introduction of salsa in many countries.

In the 1980s, Leavitt became an independent producer and produced two records for Bobby Valentín Bronco Records. In the 1990s, He established his own record recording company, R. L. Records. The company's first production was the album titled Provocame (Provoke Me), which became a hit in Puerto Rico, United States and South America.

== European tour ==
In 1993, Leavitt and La Selecta made their European debut in Spain. During that tour, they also held concerts in Germany, Switzerland, Italy and France.

== Later years and death ==
Leavitt was presented the Rafael Hernández Golden Bust Award for his compositions "Payaso" ("Clown"), "Jíbaro Soy" ("I'm a Countryboy") and "La Cuna Blanca" ("The White Crib"). In 2003, Leavitt and La Selecta held a concert at the Luis A. Ferré Center of Fine Arts in San Juan, where the group was awarded a Tu Musica Award for "Best Salsa Recording of the Year". The event was made into a television special entitled Raphy Leavitt and his Selecta Orchestra: 30 years of Music History. Raphy Leavitt and La Selecta continued to be active with musical presentations and tours.

Raphy Leavitt died on August 5, 2015, at his home in Miami, Florida, two days after surgery to remove bacteria found around his artificial hip. He was buried at Porta Coeli Cemetery in Bayamón, Puerto Rico

== Discography ==
=== Albums and singles ===
- Payaso (1971)
- Mi Barrio (1972)
- Jibaro Soy (1973)
- Herido (1974)
- A Recorded Inferno... (1975)
- De Frente a la Vida (1976)
- Con Sabor a Tierra Adentro (1977)
- Cosquillita (1978)
- Soledad (1979)
- Raphy Leavitt y la Selecta (1981)
- 10 Años Sembrando Semillas en el Alma del Pueblo (1982)
- Siempre Alegre (1983)
- Somos el Son (1986)
- Orquesta la Selecta (1988)
- ¡Provócame! (1990)
- 20 Años Después (1992)
- 30 Aniversario (Recorded live) (2003)
- "Cuarentona" (Single) 2015
- Hasta Siempre! (2015)

=== Compilation albums ===
- Lo Mejor de Raphy Leavitt (1975)
- El Disco de Oro (1987)
- 12 Grandes Éxitos (1990)
- Éxitos Vol. 2 (1993)
- Grandes Éxitos Vol. 1 (1993)
- Grandes Éxitos Vol. 2 (1994)
- Oro Salsero Vol. 1 (1994)
- Oro Salsero Vol. 2 (1994)
- 12 Boleros (2000)
- 30 Años de Éxitos (2001)
- Live: 30 Aniversario (2003)
- The Greatest Salsa Ever (2008)

== See also ==
- List of Puerto Ricans
- Jewish immigration to Puerto Rico
