= José Semidei Rodríguez =

Puerto Rican soldier and diplomat

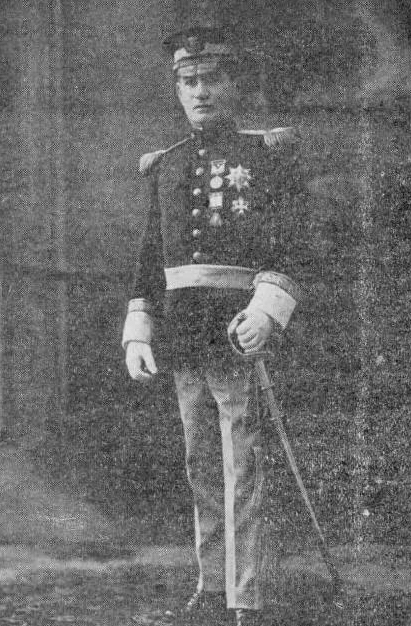
- Brigadier General José Semidei Rodríguez
- Born: 12 September 1868; Yauco, Spanish Puerto Rico
- Died: 19 February 1958 (aged 89); Havana, Cuba
- Military career
- Allegiance: Cuban Liberation Army; Cuban National Army
- Service years: 1895 - 1932
- Rank: Brigadier General
- Conflicts: Cuban War of Independence; *Battle of "Las Villas"

Brigadier General José Semidei Rodríguez (September 12, 1868 - February 19, 1958) was a Puerto Rican soldier and diplomat. He participated in Cuban independence movement that immediately preceded the Spanish–American War. Before becoming a brigadier general in the Cuban National Army, Semidei Rodríguez fought in the Cuban War of Independence (1895–1898) as a member of the Cuban Liberation Army, the rebel force which fought for Cuba's independence from Spanish colonial rule. After Cuba gained its independence he continued to serve in that country as a diplomat.

== Early years ==
Semidei (sometimes spelled "Semidey") Rodríguez was born to Pascual Semidei and Celestina Rodríguez in the town of Yauco, Puerto Rico. The Semidei's were among the hundreds of Corsican families which immigrated to Puerto Rico as a result of the various economic and political changes in the mid-19th century Europe; among those factors were the social-economic changes which came about in Europe as a result of the Second Industrial Revolution, political discontent and widespread crop failure due to long periods of drought, and crop diseases.

Another influential factor was that Spain had lost most of its possessions in the so-called "New World" and feared the possibility of a rebellion in its last two Caribbean possessions—Puerto Rico and Cuba. As a consequence the Spanish Crown had issued the Royal Decree of Graces (Real Cedula de Gracias) which fostered and encouraged the immigration of Catholics of non-Hispanic origin to its Caribbean Colonies. The situation and opportunities offered, plus the fact that the geographies of the islands are similar, were ideal for the immigration of hundreds of families, such as the Semidey's, from Corsica to Puerto Rico. Corsicans and those of Corsican descent have played an instrumental role in the development of the economy of the island, especially in the coffee industry. The Semidei's, as did the majority of the Corsican immigrants, settled in the southwestern town of Yauco which is located in the southern coast of the island by the Caribbean Sea.

The Semidei's were dedicated to the cultivation of coffee and within a short period of time were very successful in their venture. Semidei Rodríguez received his primary education in his hometown and in 1879, he was sent to the Dominican Republic to continue his academic training in that country's educational institutions.

== Cuban War of Independence ==
The Cuban War of Independence (1895–1898), was the last three liberation wars, that Cuba fought against Spain which started on October 10, 1868, when sugar mill owner Carlos Manuel de Céspedes and his followers proclaimed Cuba's independence from Spain. The final three months of the last conflict escalated to become the Spanish–American War. Semidei Rodríguez became involved with the Cuban independence movement. On June 5, 1895, he participated in the armed expedition headed by Generals Carlos Roloff, Serafin Sánchez and Aurelio C. Rodríguez. According to a New York Times article, published on August 1, 1895, the Roloff, Sánchez, Rodríguez expedition carried 280 men, 2,800 rounds of ammunition, 350 rifles 4,700 pounds of dynamite, one Gatling gun and one cannon. The expedition landed near Sagua Lachico, in Santa Clara. The final three months of the last conflict escalated to become the Spanish–American War.

Among the battles in which Semidei Rodríguez fought were the Battles of "Las Villas", where the rebels had 41 encounters with the 40,000 Spanish soldiers, cavalry and infantry, and the Battle of "Sagua la Grande". The war did not end with the death of Cuban Rebel leader General Antonio Maceo Grajales. Even without the Bronze Titan (as Maceo is remembered) the Cubans were more than the Spaniards could handle. Spain was finally defeated when the United States intervened in 1898.

== Post war and final years ==
After the hostilities between Spain, Cuba and the United States came to an end and Cuba was granted its independence, Semidei Rodríguez entered the Cuban National Army with the rank of captain. In 1905, he was promoted to commandant. He continued to serve and in 1913 was promoted to lieutenant colonel and in 1919 to colonel. On August 19, 1921, Semidei Rodríguez was promoted to brigadier general. Semidei Rodríguez retired from the military in 1932 and in 1933 served as a diplomat representing Cuba. He was the appointed Cuban ambassador to the Dominican Republic and Haiti. On February 19, 1958, Semidei Rodríguez died in Havana, Cuba.

== See also ==
- Military history of Puerto Rico
- List of Puerto Ricans
- List of Puerto Rican military personnel
- Corsican immigration to Puerto Rico
- Juan Ríus Rivera
- Francisco Gonzalo Marín
