= Manuel Rojas Luzardo =

Puerto Rican-Venezuelan activist

Manuel Rojas
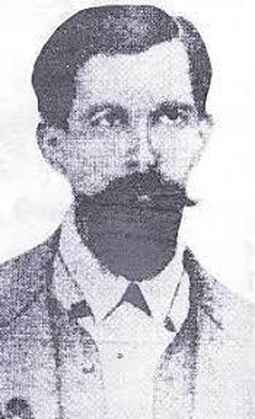
- Born: c. 1831; City of Obispos in the state of Barinas, Venezuela
- Died: October 14, 1903; City of Boconó in the state of Trujillo, Venezuela
- Military career
- Allegiance: Puerto Rico
- Branch: "Revolution Committee of Puerto Rico"
- Rank: Commander
- Commands: Puerto Rican Liberation Army
- Conflicts: El Grito de Lares

Manuel Rojas Luzardo (c. 1831 – October 14, 1903) was a Puerto Rican-Venezuelan commander of the Puerto Rican Liberation Army and one of the main leaders of the Grito de Lares uprising against Spanish rule in Puerto Rico.

== Early years ==
Manuel Rojas Luzardo was born in the city of Obispos in the state of Barinas, Venezuela, from a Puerto Rican father and a Venezuelan mother. There he received his primary and secondary education. Rojas was a dedicated agricultural worker and when he had saved enough money he moved to Valencia, Spain where he became a successful businessmen. In the early 19th century Venezuela's economy was in turmoil because of internal wars. Rojas decided to go to Puerto Rico where he met and married Obdulia de los Ríos.

The Rojas family moved close to the town of Lares where they settled down. The region was mountainous and its main income came from the coffee crop. Rojas and his brother, Miguel eventually bought and cultivated a 300-acre (120 ha) coffee plantation. The successful plantation was called "El Triunfo", and both men became wealthy merchants. His brother Miguel meet Mariana Bracetti while on a business trip to Añasco. Miguel and Mariana married and moved to "El Triunfo" where the Rojas lived.

== Puerto Rico's independence movement ==
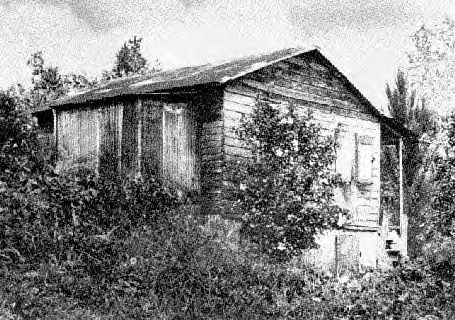
Manuel Rojas house in 1965

Rojas admired Puerto Rican independence advocate Ramón Emeterio Betances and together with his brother Miguel, joined Betances in his quest for Puerto Rico's independence. A "Revolution Committee of Puerto Rico" was formed and directed by Betances and Segundo Ruiz Belvis, who were exiled, from the Dominican Republic. Several revolutionary cells were formed in the towns and cities in the western part of the island. They were to support the armed invasion that Betances had planned to bring from the Dominican Republic.

Two of the most important cells were that of Mayagüez, whose leader was Mathias Brugman and code named "Capa Prieto" and that of Lares, code named "Centro Bravo" and headed by Manuel Rojas. "Centro Bravo" was the main center of operations and was located in the Rojas plantation. Manuel Rojas was named "Commander of the Liberation Army" by Betances. Mariana Bracetti (wife of Miguel) was named "Leader of the Lares Revolutionary Council". Upon the request of Betances, Bracetti knitted the revolutionary Flag of Lares known as "La Bandera de Lares".

The Revolutionary Committee named twelve of their members generals of the revolution. They were:

- Manuel Rojas, Commander in Chief of the Liberation Army
- Andres Pol, General of Division
- Juan de Mata Terraforte, General of Division
- Joaquín Parrilla, General of Division
- Nicolás Rocafort, General of Division
- Gabino Plumey, General of Division
- Dorvid Beauchamp, General of Division
- Mathías Brugman, General of Division
- Rafael Arroyo, General of Division
- Francisco Arroyo, General of Division
- Pablo Rivera, Cavalry General
- Abdón Pagán, Artillery General

The Spanish authorities found out about the plot and were able to confiscate the armed ship which Betances had, before it arrived in Puerto Rico. The Mayor of the town of Camuy, Manuel González (who also happened to be the leader of that town's revolutionary cell) was arrested and charged with treason. He was able to hear that the Spanish Army was aware of the independence plot. He then escaped and was able to warn Manuel Rojas.

== El Grito de Lares ==
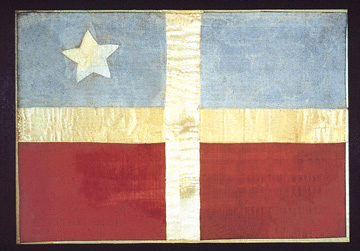
Original Revolutionary Flag of Lares

Because of this event, the revolutionists decided to start the revolution as soon as possible and set the date for September 23, 1868. Mathias Brugman and his men joined up with Manuel Rojas's men and with about 800 men and women, marched and took the town of Lares in what is known as "El Grito de Lares". The revolutionists entered the town's church and placed the revolutionary flag knitted by Bracetti on the High Altar as a sign that the revolution had begun. They declared Puerto Rico to be the "Republic of Puerto Rico" and named Francisco Ramírez Medina President of the Republic of Puerto Rico.

Rojas and his poorly armed followers proceeded to march on to the town of San Sebastián, armed only with clubs and machetes. The Spanish Army had been forewarned and were waiting for them with superior firepower. When the revolutionists arrived, they were met with deadly fire.

The revolt failed and many of the revolutionists were killed and at least 475 including, Manuel Rojas and Mariana Bracetti were imprisoned in the jail of Arecibo and sentenced to death. Some of them fled and went into hiding. Mathias Brugman was hiding in a local farm when a farm hand by the name of Francisco Quiñones, betrayed him and led the Spanish Authorities to Brugman's hiding place. He was executed on the spot.

== Aftermath ==
He was arrested that October and sentenced to death by a court-martial. Eugenio María de Hostos led a group of Puerto Ricans who defended those who were involved in the revolt. They met with Spanish President Francisco Serrano (Serrano had just led a revolution against the monarchy in Spain) in Madrid and requested that Rojas and the others be pardoned and that the government not carry out the death penalties imposed upon them. Serrano told de Hostos that if an amnesty was granted it would be for the natives of Puerto Rico and not for the foreigners who participated in the revolt, referring to Rojas. However, de Hostos argued that Rojas was an adoptive son of Puerto Rico, since he arrived in the island at a young age and made it his home and as such should have the same rights that the others had. The incoming governor of Puerto Rico, Jose Sanz, received orders from the new Republican Spanish Government to grant a general amnesty to all those imprisoned, effective on September 20, 1869. Manuel Rojas along with some of the other men involved in the revolution were sent into exile.

Rojas was exiled to Venezuela and went to live in Boconó a city in the Venezuelan Andean state of Trujillo. Little is known about what he did after he went into exile except that he died on October 14, 1903, in Boconó. On December 25, 2002, the Government of Puerto Rico approved Public Law #291, which instructed the Institute of Puerto Rican Culture to study the possibility of transferring the remains of Manuel Rojas, considered by many to be among Puerto Rico's greatest independence leaders.

== Legacy ==
A school in Bartolo, Lares, Puerto Rico is named after Rojas.

== See also ==
- List of Puerto Ricans
- List of Puerto Rican military personnel
