= Janea Padilha =

Janea Padilha is a beautician, entrepreneur and author, best known for popularizing Brazilian bikini waxing. In 2010, she released the book Brazilian Sexy, co-authored with Martha Frankel.

She co-operates the J. Sisters salon in New York City, famous for having celebrity clients such as Vanessa Williams.
