= The Secret Abolitionist Society =

The Secret Abolitionist Society (Spanish: La Sociedad Abolicionista Secreta) was a group of Puerto Rican Abolitionists led by Ramón Emeterio Betances and Segundo Ruiz Belvis that secretly freed enslaved children by purchasing their freedom during baptism ceremonies.

The group was founded in 1857 and the events which were known as "aguas de libertad" were carried out at the Cathedral of Mayagüez. Some other figures involved include José Francisco Basora and José Remigio Paradís.

== See also ==
- History of Puerto Rico
