= Kevin Padilla =

American taekwondo practitioner

Kevin Padilla (born July 7, 1964) is an American former taekwondo practitioner. He has won multiple medals in a number of tournaments. In 1989 he earned a silver in the Taekwondo World Cup. He currently works as a coach and as a chair for the USA Team USA Taekwondo Board of Directors. He has also been a four-time U.S. National Team member, as well as a World Cup medalist and U.S. Taekwondo Union Athlete of the Year. He also works unofficially as USA Taekwondo's chief scout. Amongst his instructors is Marc Williams.
