= Mathias Brugman =

Puerto Rican activist

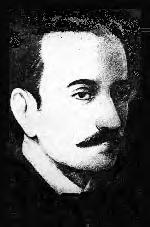
- Born: Mathias Brugman Duliebre; January 3, 1811; New Orleans, Louisiana, U.S.
- Died: September 30, 1868; Lares, Puerto Rico
- Cause of death: Execution
- Occupations: Businessman, revolutionary
- Known for: Leadership in El Grito de Lares

Mathias Brugman (also Mathias Bruckman; January 3, 1811 – September 30, 1868) was a leader in Puerto Rico's independence revolution against Spain known as El Grito de Lares (transl. The Cry of Lares).

== Early life ==
Brugman's father was Pierre Brugman from Curaçao of Dutch–Jewish Sephardic ancestry. His mother was Isabel Duliebre from Puerto Rico, of a Haitian Creole family. His ethnicity has been described as Afro-Caribbean. Brugman's parents met and married in New Orleans, Louisiana where Brugman was born, raised and educated.

On January 3, 1811, Brugman was born in New Orleans. His parents baptized him in the St. Louis Cathedral in New Orleans, although his family practiced Judaism in secret. His birth name was Mathias Brugman Duliebre.

The Brugman family moved to Puerto Rico when he was 5 years old. They settled in the city of Mayagüez where Mathias met and married Ana Maria Laborde. He opened a colmado (grocery store) and became rather successful, only to lose a good part of his fortune attempting to grow coffee. Like many other residents of Puerto Rico at the time, he resented the political injustices practiced by Spain on the island. This led him to become a believer in the cause of the Puerto Rican independence movement.

Brugman owned a farm in Las Marías, Puerto Rico.

== Uprising ==
Brugman admired independence advocates Ramón Emeterio Betances and Segundo Ruiz Belvis. It was this admiration which inspired him to become an outspoken advocate for Puerto Rico's independence.

In his grocery store, people would normally gather on a daily basis to discuss politics. Brugman eventually befriended Manuel Rojas and his brother Miguel. Together with his son, Hector, Brugman joined them in a conspiracy to revolt against Spain. With a group of other patriots, they formed revolutionary committees. These committees were mainly based on the west coast towns of Puerto Rico. The first revolutionary committee formed was Mathias Brugman's in Mayagüez. He used his colmado as his headquarters and his cell was codenamed: "Capa Prieta" (Black Cape). Manuel Rojas' committee in Lares was codenamed "Centro Bravo" (Bravo Center).

=== El Grito de Lares ===
On September 23, 1868, the revolution began and the town of Lares was taken in what was to be known as El Grito de Lares (transl. The Cry of Lares). The revolutionists declared Puerto Rico to be the free "Republic of Puerto Rico". However, the Spanish were already forewarned, and they soon defeated the small army of liberators.

Mathias Brugman, along with his son Hector and Baldomero Baurer (a fellow revolutionist), went into hiding and managed a guerrilla warfare campaign from the mountains. Many of the others were either killed or imprisoned, including Manuel Rojas and Mariana Bracetti. On September 30, 1868, a farm worker, Francisco Quiñones, who worked in the Asunción Plantation, betrayed Brugman, his son and Baurer and led the Spanish authorities to where they were hiding. The men refused to surrender and eventually were executed. Mathias Brugman died in the town of Yauco, Puerto Rico in 1868.

== See also ==
- List of Puerto Ricans
- Jewish immigration to Puerto Rico
- History of the Jews in Puerto Rico
