= Trina Padilla de Sanz =

American journalist

- Born: June 7, 1894; Vega Baja, Puerto Rico
- Died: April 26, 1957 (aged 62); Arecibo, Puerto Rico
- Other names: Trinidad Padilla de Sanz
- Occupation: Writer

Trinidad "Trina" Padilla de Sanz (June 7, 1894 in Vega Baja – April 26, 1957 in Arecibo) was a Puerto Rican writer. She was born in Vega Baja and adopted at Arecibo; she was a piano teacher, storyteller, and poet. Daughter of the doctor and poet José Gualberto Padilla, known as "El Caribe" ("The Caribbean"). Thus, Trina Padilla de Sanz was known as "La Hija del Caribe" ("The Daughter of the Caribbean"). She studied at Ruiz Arnau high school in Arecibo. At the age of 18, she married Ángel Sanz, and moved to Madrid where she enrolled at Real Conservatorio and took piano lessons before returning to Arecibo.

Along with Librada Rodríguez and María Cadilla de Martínez, she created the "Liga Femenina" with the purpose of studying women's rights and how they affect society.

She wrote for El Heraldo Español, Puerto Rico Ilustrado, El Mundo, and El Imparcial. She wrote eight books, including three of poetry: Rebeldía in 1918, De mi collar in 1926 and Cálices abiertos in 1943. The other books are stories, narrations, chronicles of art, and one about womanhood.

== See also ==
- Puerto Rican literature
