= Martha Frankel =

American writer

Martha Frankel (born July 18, 1953) is an American writer. She was born in the Bronx, New York.

Martha Frankel by Franco Vogt

== Career ==
She began her writing career at the original Details magazine, writing a column about plastic surgery titled Knifestyles of the Rich and Famous. She went on to write book reviews, essays and celebrity profiles for other magazines, such as Movieline, Cosmopolitan and The New Yorker.

Currently, she serves as executive director of the Woodstock Bookfest, a yearly gathering of writers and readers in Woodstock, New York.

Martha is host of Story Slams in and around Woodstock, and an avid storyteller herself.

== Publications ==
Her memoir, Hats & Eyeglasses, chronicling her family's lifelong love affair with gambling, was published in 2008 (Tarcher/Penguin Group). "Hats and eyeglasses" is an old gambling expression describing an unfortunate run at the table. In Frankel's childhood, gambling equated to friendship, food and laughter. "We bet on everything, from sports to how much our mothers would lose at Weight Watchers," Frankel recalls in the book.

Her second book, Brazilian Sexy: Secrets to Living a Gorgeous and Confident Life (co-written with Janea Padilha) was published in April 2010 (Perigee/Penguin Group). Her essay "Looped Yarn" appears in the anthology Knitting Yarns: Writers on Knitting (2013), published by W. W. Norton & Company.

== Awards and recognition ==
Frankel is a winner of a New York Foundation for the Arts (NYFFA) Award in creative nonfiction. She was the 1997 Philip Morris Fellow at the MacDowell Colony, and the 2003 Artist-in-Residence at SUNY Ulster, where she taught a class in memoir writing.

== Personal life ==
She has lived in the upstate New York town of Boiceville for over 50 years, with her husband, the artist Steve Heller.
