= Grito de Lares =

1868 revolt against Spanish rule in Puerto Rico

- Part of Ten Years' War and Puerto Rican Independence Movement
- Flag of the Lares Revolt
Date	September 23–24, 1868
Location	Lares, Puerto Rico
Result	Spanish victory

Belligerents
Republic of Puerto Rico: Puerto Rico Liberation Army	Spanish Empire: Captaincy General of Puerto Rico

Commanders and leaders
Francisco Ramírez Medina; Ramón Emeterio Betances; Manuel Rojas Luzardo; Mathias Brugman	García Pérez

Strength
400–600 rebels	unknown

Casualties and losses
4 battle deaths 6 wounded 7 captured	-

Grito de Lares (Cry of Lares), also referred to as the Lares revolt, or the Lares revolution, was the first short revolt against Spanish rule in Puerto Rico, staged by the Revolutionary Committee of Puerto Rico on September 23, 1868. Three decades after its uprising in Lares, the committee carried out a second unsuccessful revolt in the neighboring southwestern municipality of Yauco, known as the Intentona de Yauco (Attempted Coup of Yauco). The Grito de Lares flag is recognized as the first flag of Puerto Rico.

== Causes of revolt ==
In the 1860s, the government of Spain was involved in several conflicts across Latin America. It became involved in a war with Peru and Chile and had to address slave revolts in Cuba. At the time, Puerto Rico and Cuba also suffered a severe economic crisis because of increasing tariffs and taxes imposed by the Spanish central government on most import and export goods. The Spanish crown needed the funds badly to subsidize its troops in the Dominican Republic, which Spain had annexed in 1861, only to leaving in 1865 following the Dominican Restoration War.

In mid-19th century Puerto Rico, many supporters of independence from Spain, as well as others who did not support independence from Spain but simply called for liberal reforms, were jailed or exiled. However, in 1865, the central government in Madrid, finally attempted to appease the growing discontent in all its overseas provinces by setting up a "board of review" to receive complaints from provincial representatives. The board, the Junta Informativa de Reformas de Ultramar (Informative Board on Overseas Reforms) would be formed by representatives of each overseas province in proportion to their collective population. The board would meet in Madrid and report to the Minister of State (Ministro de Estado), Emilio Castelar.

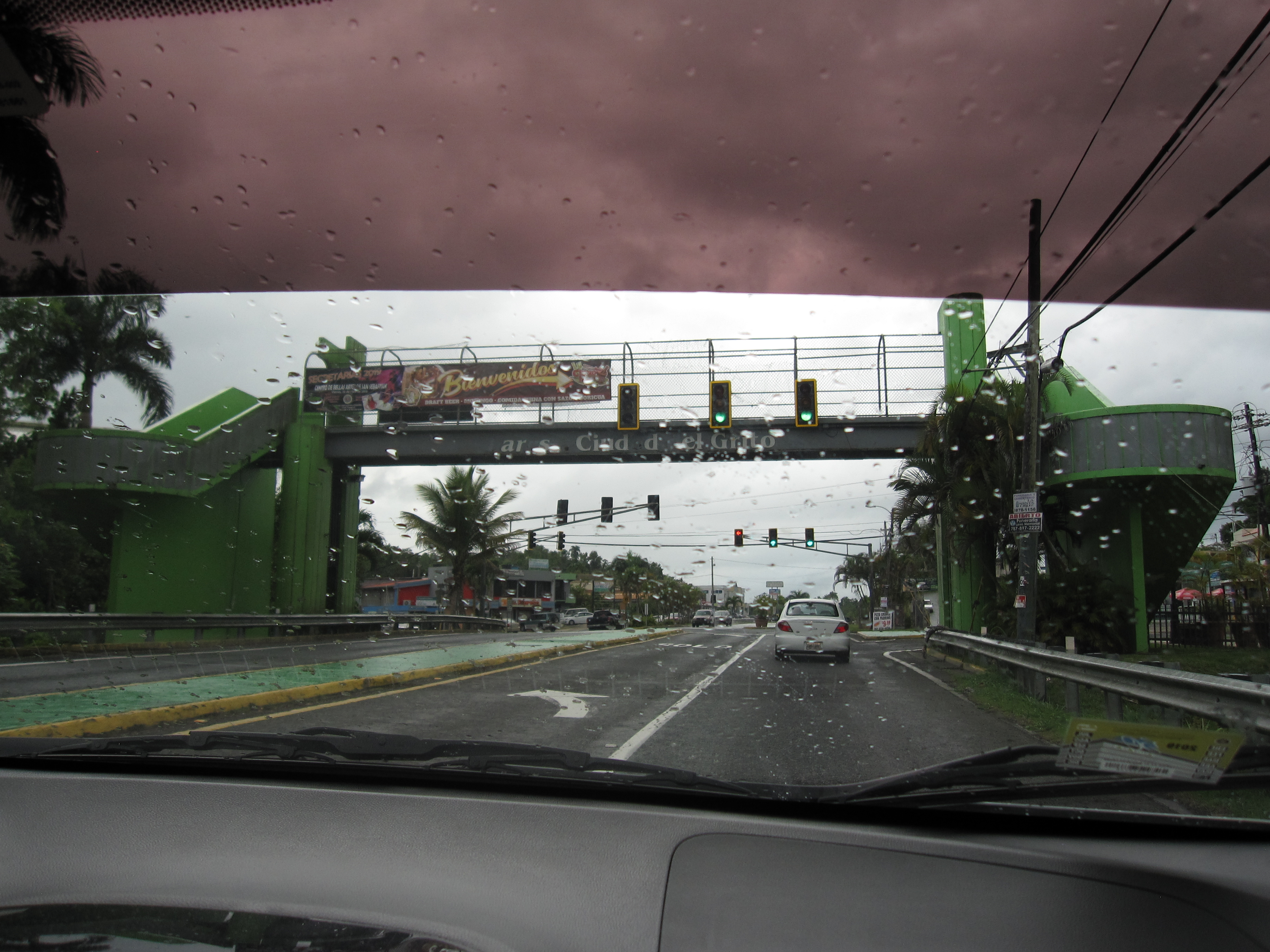
The city's nickname, Ciudad del Grito can be seen on an overpass as one enters Lares

The Puerto Rican delegation was freely elected by those eligible to vote (male white property owners) in what was one of the first exercises of political openness in Spain. The separatist Segundo Ruiz Belvis was elected to the Junta representing Mayagüez, which horrified the governor of Puerto Rico as well as most of residents of the island since the majority of Puerto Ricans did not support independence from Spain.

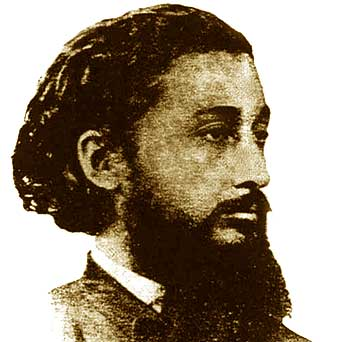
Ramón Emeterio Betances, co-leader of the revolt

To the frustration of the Puerto Rican delegates, including their leader José Julián Acosta, the Junta had a majority of mainland Spain-born delegates, which would vote down almost every measure they suggested, including the measure on the abolition of slavery. However, Acosta could convince the Junta that abolition could be achieved in Puerto Rico without disrupting the local economy, including its Cuban members, who frowned upon implementing it in Cuba because of its much higher numbers of slave labor. Emilio Castelar y Ripoll, once he became minister for foreign affairs in 1870, finally approved an abolition bill and praised the efforts of the Puerto Rican members, who were sincerely moved by Acosta's arguments.

Beyond abolition, however, proposals for autonomy were voted down, as were other petitions to limit the governor general's power over virtually every aspect of life in Puerto Rico. Once the Junta members returned to Puerto Rico, they met with local community leaders in a famed meeting at the Hacienda El Cacao in Carolina, in early 1865.

Ramón Emeterio Betances, who supported independence from Spain and had been exiled by the Spanish government twice, was invited by Ruiz and attended. After listening to the Junta members' list of voted-down measures, Betances stood up and retorted: "Nadie puede dar lo que no tiene" (You can't give away what you don't own), a phrase that he used throughout his entire life to refer to Spain's unwillingness to grant Puerto Rico or Cuba any reforms.

Betances then suggested an outright island-wide rebellion, with a proclamation of independence as soon as possible. To Acosta's horror, many of the meeting's attendees sided with Betances.

Frustrated by the lack of political and economic freedom, by the continuing repression on the island, all of which was caused by the extreme centralism of the Spanish central government in Madrid, an armed rebellion was soon staged by the pro-independence movement.

== Rebellion ==
=== Planning stage ===
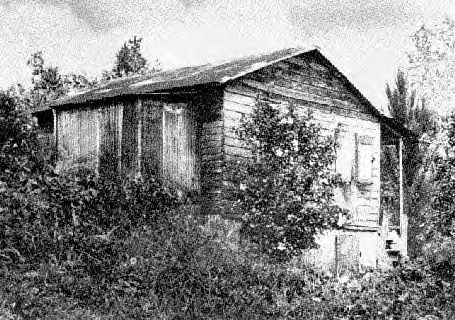
Manuel Rojas house in 1965

The Lares uprising, commonly known as the Grito de Lares, was a planned uprising that occurred on September 23, 1868. Grito was synonymous with a "cry for independence" and that cry was made in Brazil with el Grito de Ipiranga, in Mexico with El Grito de Dolores, in the Dominican Republic with Grito de Capotillo and in Cuba with El Grito de Yara. In Puerto Rico, a group led by Dr. Ramón Emeterio Betances and Segundo Ruiz Belvis founded the Revolutionary Committee of Puerto Rico (Comité Revolucionario de Puerto Rico) on January 6, 1868, from their exile in the Dominican Republic.

Betances authored several Proclamas, or statements attacking the exploitation of the Puerto Ricans by the Spanish centralist system and called for immediate insurrection. These statements soon circulated throughout the island as local dissident groups began to organize. Among them, Los Diez Mandamientos de los hombres libres (The Ten Commandments of Free Men) written in exile in Saint Thomas in November 1867., directly based on the Declaration of the Rights of Man and of the Citizen, adopted by France's National Assembly in 1789.

That same year, poet Lola Rodríguez de Tió, inspired by Ramón Emeterio Betances's quest for Puerto Rico's independence, wrote the patriotic lyrics to the existing tune of La Borinqueña, Puerto Rico's national anthem.

Although Mariana Bracetti is popularly credited with having sewed the Grito de Lares flag, it was fellow revolutionary Eduviges Beauchamp Sterling who embroidered the flag, while Bracetti was in charge of the encrypted communications used for the planning and execution of the revolt. The flag was divided in the middle by a white Latin cross, the two lower corners were red and the two upper corners were blue. A five-pointed white star was placed in the upper left blue corner. According to Puerto Rican poet Luis Lloréns Torres the white cross stands for the yearning for homeland redemption; the red squares, the blood poured by the heroes of the rebellion and the white star in the blue solitude square, stands for liberty and freedom.

Secret cells of the Revolutionary Committee were established in Puerto Rico by Mathias Brugman, Mariana Bracetti and Manuel Rojas bringing together members from all sectors of society including landowners, merchants, professionals, peasants, and slaves. Most were criollos (Spaniards born on the island).

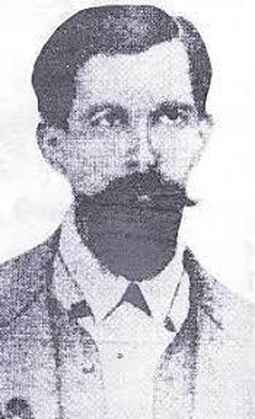
General Manuel Rojas

The Revolutionary Committee named twelve of their members as generales (generals). They were:

- Manuel Rojas, Commander-in-Chief of the Liberation Army
- Andrés Pol, Major General
- Juan de Mata Terreforte, Major General
- Joaquín Parrilla, Major General
- Nicolás Rocafort, Major General
- Gabino Plumey, Major General
- Dorvid Beauchamp, Major General
- Mathías Brugman, Major General
- Rafael Arroyo, Major General
- Francisco Arroyo, Major General
- Pablo Rivera, Brigadier General - Cavalry
- Abdón Pagán, Major General - Artillery

The critical state of the economy, slavery, and the increasing political repression from the Spanish central government, served as catalysts for the rebellion.

The stronghold of the movement were towns located in the mountains, on the western part of the island.

On September 20, Francisco Ramírez Medina held a meeting at his house in which the insurrection was planned and set to begin in Camuy on September 29. The meeting was attended by Marcelino Vega, Carlos Martínez, Bonifacio Agüero, José Antonio Hernández, Ramón Estrella, Bartolomé González, Cesilio López, Antonio Santiago, Manuel Ramírez, Ulises Cancela. Cancela instructed Manuel María González to deliver all of the acts and important papers in regard to the meeting to Manuel Rojas.

Juan Castañón, a captain stationed in Quebradillas, overheard two cell members commenting that on September 29 the troops at Camuy would be neutralized by poisoning the bread rations. Given the fact that September 29 would be a holiday for most laborers, simultaneous uprisings would occur, beginning with the cell in Camuy, and following with the ones in various other points; reinforcements would arrive on a ship, El Telégrafo, and the cells would be reinforced by more than 3,000 mercenaries. Castañón and his men then entered González's residence and confiscated the documents of Medina's meeting and alerted his commanding officer in Arecibo. The cell leaders at the Lanzador del Norte cell in Camuy were soon arrested.

On another front, the Dominican government had supported Ramón Emeterio Betances. They allowed him to recruit a small army, and gave him a ship containing weapons. However, when the ship was about to sail, the Spanish government made its move. It prohibited the ship's departure from Dominican territory. The authorities in the then Danish West Indies Saint Thomas, U.S. Virgin Islands, where the ship was anchored, boarded the vessel and confiscated its cargo.

Seeing their plans disrupted, the other leaders feared arrest. They decided to change the date of the revolution for an earlier one without consulting Betances.

=== Proclamation of the Republic of Puerto Rico ===
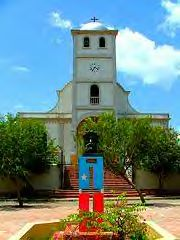
Roman Catholic Church of Lares and Monument to the Grito at the Plaza de la Revolución

The leaders decided to start their revolution in the town of Lares on September 23. Some 400–600 rebels gathered on that day in the estate of Manuel Rojas, located in the vicinity of Pezuela, on the outskirts of Lares. Led by Rojas and Juan de Mata Terreforte, the poorly trained and sparsely armed rebels reached the town by horse and foot at around midnight. They looted local stores and offices owned by peninsulares (Spanish mainland-born men) and took over the city hall. Spanish mainland-born merchants and Puerto Rican government authorities, considered by the rebels as enemies of the fatherland, were taken as prisoners.

The rebels then entered the town's church and placed the revolutionary flag of Lares on the High Altar. This was the sign that the revolution had begun. The Republic of Puerto Rico was proclaimed at (2:00 am local time) under the presidency of Francisco Ramírez Medina at the church and the revolutionaries offered freedom to the slaves who joined them. President Ramírez Medina appointed Government officials as follows:

- Francisco Ramírez Medina, President
- Aurelio Méndez, Minister of the Interior
- Manuel Ramírez, Minister of State
- Celedonio Abril, Minister of the Treasury
- Federico Valencia, Minister of War
- Clemente Millán, Minister of Justice
- Bernabé Pol, Secretary to the President
- Manuel Rojas, Commander in Chief of the Liberation Army

=== Battle of El Pepino ===
At approximately 8:30 a.m., the cavalry commanded by Ibarra and Cebollero entered the town square. Their entry was followed by that of General Rojas and 60 men, who entered the square via Comercio Street (at that time the town's main street). An exchange of gunfire and shouts quickly began between the town's defenders and the revolutionaries. The revolutionary cavalry attempted to enter the militia barracks, only to be repulsed by bursts of fire from the defenders. After half an hour of fighting, at 9:00 a.m., both the cavalry and the infantry withdrew with the intention of joining the rest of the forces and beginning a new attack.

The revolutionary forces, united under the common command of General Rojas, began their second attack from the southern end of the plaza. Their approach was met by heavy rifle fire from the militiamen and local residents. The exchange of fire left casualties on both sides. Four of the revolutionaries died (Venancio Román, Casto Santiago, Leopoldo Plumey, Manuel de León) and another (Manuel Rosado "El Leñero") was mortally wounded. Just as the town's defenders were running out of ammunition, 25 Spanish soldiers under the command of Corregidor García Pérez of Aguadilla arrived. The revolutionary forces retreated, but unlike the first attack, this time they were pursued by regular troops and El Pepino's militia. The rebels were pushed back to the other side of the bridge that crosses the Culebrinas River.

Revolutionary troops finally retreated to General Rojas's hacienda, located in the municipality of Mayagüez, and to call a meeting there with the rest of the revolutionary leadership. At the meeting at General Rojas 's hacienda, what remained of the revolutionary leadership decided to order the total withdrawal of the forces located in the town of Lares. The revolutionaries chose to hide, in small groups throughout the interior of the island, waiting for other Puerto Rican towns to revolt and for the weapons promised by Betances to arrive. Both expectations proved to be in vain. The Spanish forces quickly led to the concentration of their military power in the western part of Puerto Rico. The arrest of more than 800 suspects, the control of the roads, and the state of alert made any kind of spontaneous uprising on the island impossible. Over the next few weeks, the vast majority of the revolutionaries were arrested.

=== Trials and amnesty ===
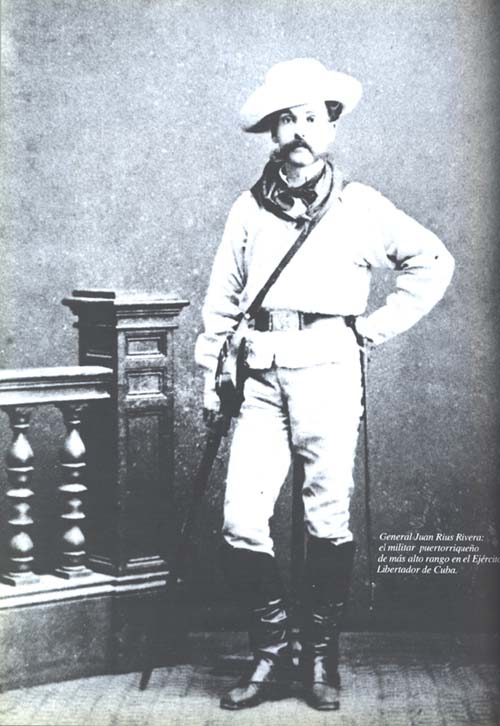
General Juan Ríus Rivera

Some 475 rebels, among them Dr. José Gualberto Padilla (leader of the Arecibo cell), Manuel Rojas and Mariana Bracetti were imprisoned in Arecibo, where they were tortured and humiliated. On November 17, a military court imposed the death penalty, for treason and sedition, on all the prisoners.

Meanwhile, in Madrid, Eugenio María de Hostos and other prominent Puerto Ricans were successful in interceding with President Francisco Serrano, who had himself just led a revolution against the monarchy in Spain. In an effort to appease the already tense atmosphere on the island, the incoming governor, José Laureano Sanz, dictated a general amnesty early in 1869 and all prisoners were released. However Betances, Rojas, Lacroix, Aurelio Méndez, and many others were sent into exile.

As a young man, Juan Ríus Rivera met and befriended Betances, and joined the pro-independence movement in the island. He became a member of the Mayagüez revolutionary cell Capá Prieto under the command of Brugman. Although he was studying law in Spain, and therefore had not participated in the Lares uprising, Ríus Rivera was an avid follower of Caribbean politics. When he learned about the failed revolt, he interrupted his law studies and traveled to the United States, where he immediately went to the Cuba Revolutionary Junta and offered his services. Juan Ríus Rivera went to Cuba and became the Commander-in-Chief of the Cuban Liberation Army of the west after General Antonio Maceo's death.

Mariana Bracetti moved to the town of Añasco, where she died in 1903.

== Aftermath ==
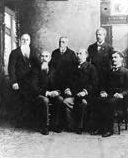
Puerto Rican Revolutionary Committee (standing L-R) Manuel Besosa, Aurelio Méndez Martínez, and Sotero Figueroa (seated L-R) Juan de Mata Terreforte, Dr. Jose Julio Henna and Roberto H. Todd

Although the revolt failed to achieve its main objective, the Spanish government granted more political autonomy to the island.

During the years immediately following the Grito, there were minor pro-independence protests and skirmishes with the Spanish authorities in Las Marías, Adjuntas, Utuado, Vieques, Bayamón, Ciales and Toa Baja (Palo Seco).

Juan de Mata Terreforte, who fought alongside Manuel Rojas, was exiled to New York City. He joined the Puerto Rican Revolutionary Committee and was named its vice-president. Terreforte and the members of the Revolutionary committee adopted the Flag of Lares as the flag of Puerto Rico until 1892, when the current design, modeled after the Cuban flag, was unveiled and adopted by the committee.

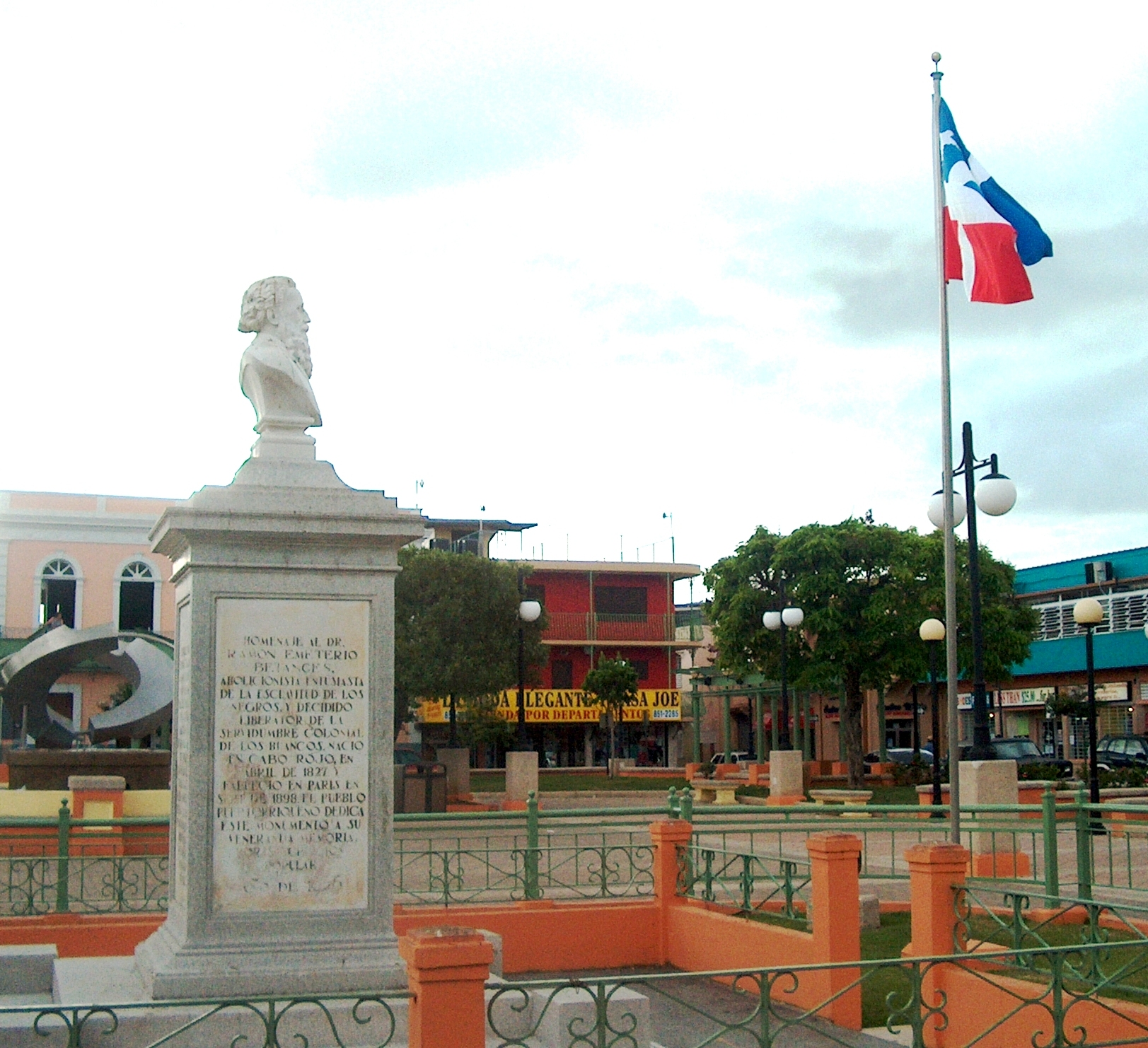
Tomb of Ramón E. Betances in Cabo Rojo, with the Lares flag in front, 2007

== Celebrated ==
While there is not an official El Grito de Lares holiday, the day is celebrated in the Plaza de Recreo de la Revolución in Lares barrio-pueblo every September.

== Photo gallery ==
People directly or indirectly involved with the revolt
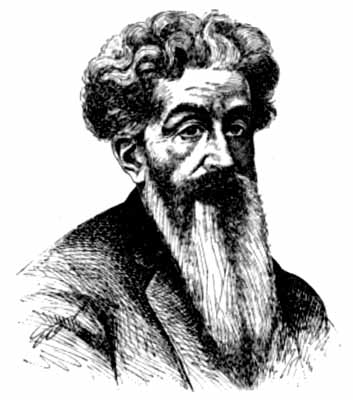
Ramón Emeterio Betances

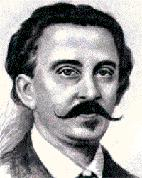
Segundo Ruiz Belvis

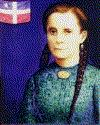
Mariana Bracetti

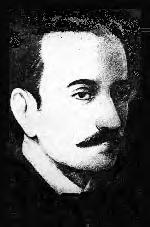
Mathias Brugman

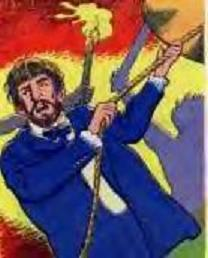
Manuel Rojas

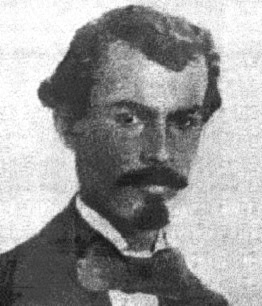
Francisco Ramírez Medina

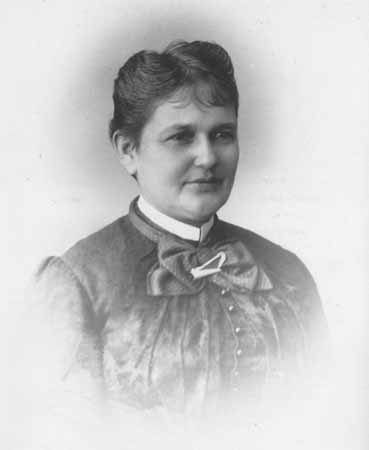
Lola Rodríguez de Tió

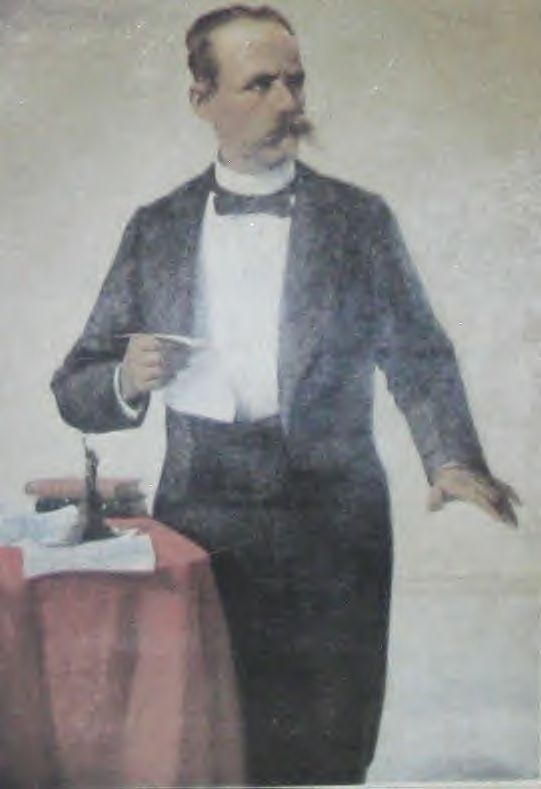
Dr. José Gualberto Padilla

== See also ==
- Military history of Puerto Rico
- Ramón Emeterio Betances
- Ducoudray Holstein Expedition
- Intentona de Yauco
- Puerto Rican Campaign
- Puerto Rican Nationalist Party Revolts of the 1950s
- Ponce massacre
- Río Piedras massacre
- Jayuya Uprising
- Utuado Uprising
- Boricua Republic
- Puerto Rican Independence Party
- Puerto Rican Nationalist Party
- List of Puerto Rican military personnel
- List of revolutions and rebellions
- Puerto Rican independence
