= Segundo Ruiz Belvis =

Puerto Rican activist

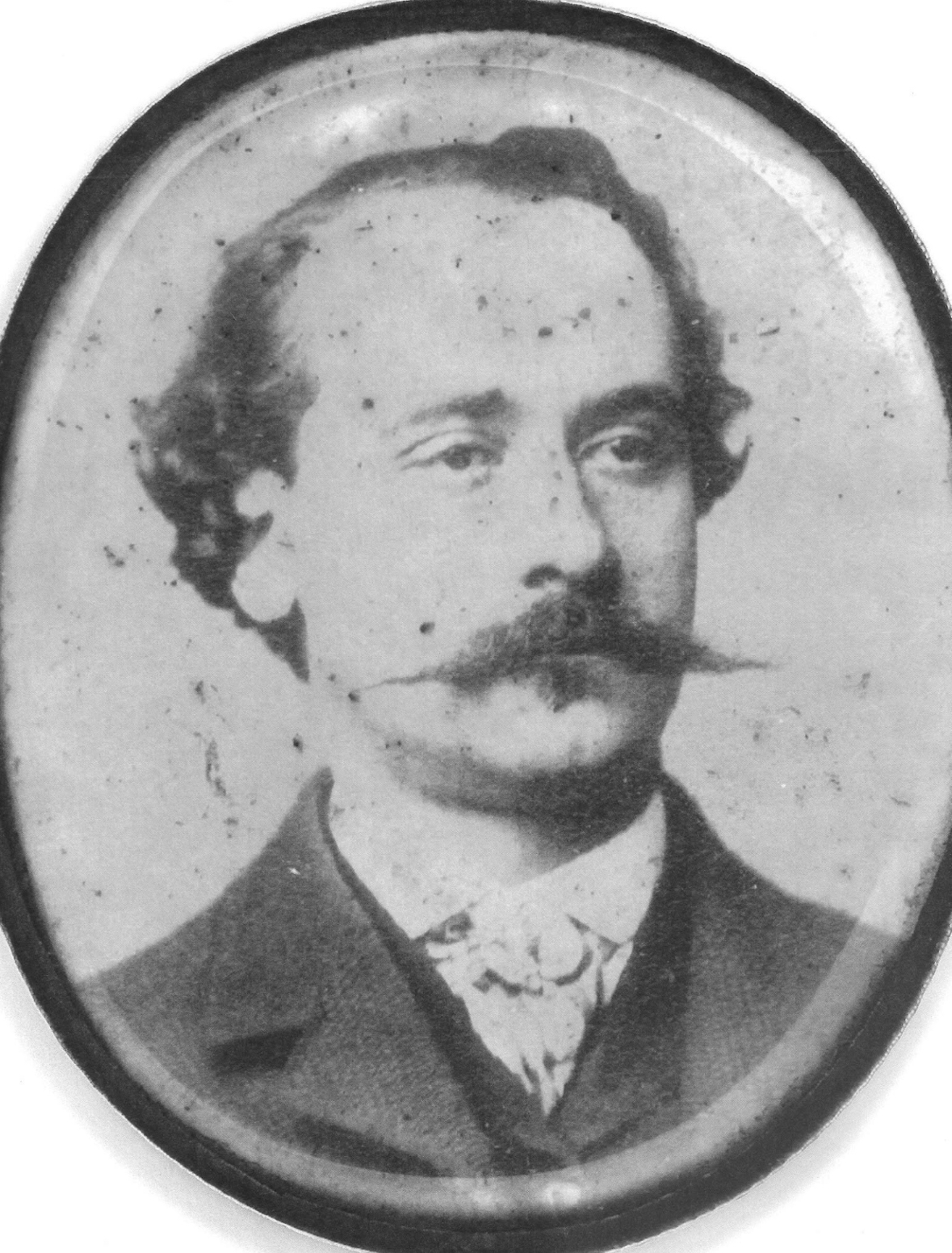
- Belvis in 1866
- Born: 13 May 1829; Hormigueros, Puerto Rico
- Died: 3 November 1867; Valparaíso, Chile
- Occupation: Abolitionist

Notes
- Ruiz Belvis helped plan an armed expedition to Puerto Rico in what was to become known as the "Grito de Lares".

Segundo Ruiz Belvis (13 May 1829 – 3 November 1867) was a Puerto Rican abolitionist who also helped found the Revolutionary Committee which led Puerto Rico's independence movement at the time.

== Early years ==
Ruiz Belvis was born in Hormigueros, Puerto Rico (then a barrio of the municipality of Mayagüez) to José Antonio Ruiz and Manuela Belvis. He received his primary education in Aguadilla. Ruiz Belvis went to Venezuela and graduated with a degree in philosophy from the University of Caracas. He later earned a law degree from the Central University of Madrid in Spain. During his stay in Spain, he befriended people with both liberal and reformist ideals who proposed the abolition of slavery.

== Abolitionist ==
In 1859, Ruiz Belvis returned to Puerto Rico and befriended Ramón Emeterio Betances, joining "The Secret Abolitionist Society" founded by Betances. The society baptized and emancipated thousands of enslaved African children. The event, which was known as "aguas de libertad" (waters of liberty), was carried out at the Cathedral of Mayagüez. Later, he moved to the city of Mayagüez where he established his law practice. Ruiz Belvis was named Justice of the Peace by the city's citizens. He was later appointed to the Mayagüez city council as a representative. His responsibilities included watching over the well being of the slaves in his district and the management of public funds. Ruiz Belvis became involved in politics and took up the cause of abolitionism in the island.

When Ruiz Belvis returned to Madrid in 1865, he represented the abolitionist cause to the Cortes Generales. Although his ideas were considered dangerous by the Spanish rulers for their threat to the existing order, he helped begin the movement that would eventually lead to the liberation of the slaves in the remaining Spanish Colonies in Latin America. In 1866 after his father's death, Ruiz Belvis inherited his family's hacienda Josefa; the first thing he did was free the slaves.

== Puerto Rican independence advocate ==
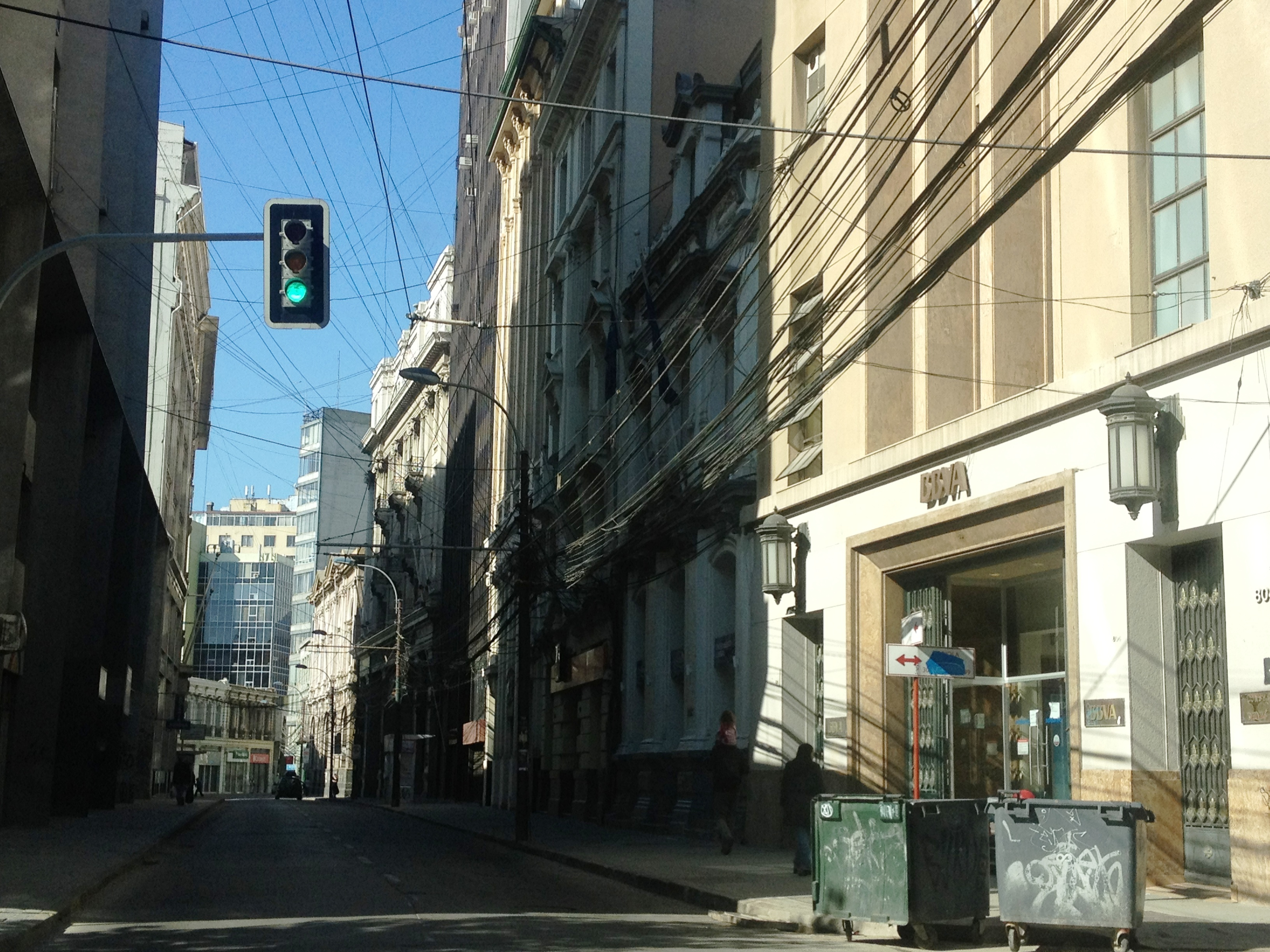
Calle Prat, Valparaíso, Chile. At this approximate location stood the Aubry Hotel, where Ruiz Belvis died in 1867.

Upon returning to Puerto Rico, Ruiz Belvis found out that the Spanish-appointed governor, José María Marchesi Oleaga, did not like the liberal ideas that Ruiz Belvis and his friends had; they were all banished to exile.

Ruiz Belvis eventually ended up in New York in 1866, where together with Betances and other patriots, he formed the "Comité Revolucionario de Puerto Rico" (Revolutionary Committee of Puerto Rico) for the independence of the island. They developed a plan to send an armed expedition to Puerto Rico, in what was to become known as the "Grito de Lares". During this time, Ruiz Belvis became ill. He still traveled to Valparaíso, Chile, to raise funds for the planned revolution.

Ruiz Belvis died in Valparaiso on 3 November 1867. He died before the uprising the next year—"Grito de Lares"—which failed. Slavery was finally abolished in Puerto Rico on 22 March 1873. He is buried in the chapel of the Cemetery of Hormigueros.

== Legacy ==
To honor the memory of Segundo Ruiz Belvis, Puerto Rico has named many streets after him. A school has been named for him in each of the following places: his birth town of Hormigueros, Ponce, and Santurce. In the United States, "Segundo Ruiz Belvis Cultural Center" was named for him in Chicago, Illinois, and "Segundo Ruiz Belvis Diagnostic and Treatment Center" in the Bronx, New York.
