= Pedro Rodríguez (soldier) =

Recipient of the Silver Star and Purple Heart US military awards

- Master Sergeant Pedro Rodríguez c. 1979; Earned two Silver Star Medals in one week
- Born: January 3, 1912; Lajas, Puerto Rico
- Died: October 19, 1999 (aged 87); Washington D.C., U.S.
- Burial place: Arlington National Cemetery
- Military career
- Allegiance: United States of America
- Branch: United States Army; Army National Guard
- Service years: 1937–1979
- Rank: Master Sergeant
- Units: 65th Infantry Regiment, 3rd Infantry Division
- Conflicts: World War II; Korean War
- Awards: Silver Star (2); Purple Heart

Master Sergeant Pedro Rodríguez (January 3, 1912 – October 19, 1999) was a U.S. Army soldier from Puerto Rico who earned two Silver Stars within a seven-day period during the Korean War. He is one of the few U.S. Army soldiers and perhaps the only Puerto Rican soldier other than Brigadier General Antonio Rodríguez Balinas, Second Lieutenant Vidal Rodriguez-Amaro, and Sergeant First Class Felix G. Nieves to receive more than one Silver Star during the Korean War. Rodríguez served in the 65th Infantry Regiment during both World War II and the Korean War; the 65th Infantry was awarded the Congressional Gold Medal in 2014.

== Early years ==
Rodríguez was born Lajas, Puerto Rico, on January 3, 1912, into a poor family. Rodríguez did not have a formal education. His father owned an ox cart and earned a living by delivering goods to the town's merchants. Rodríguez rose early in the morning to help his father. Together they went to the railroad station, where they loaded the goods onto their ox cart and then delivered them. When he was 14 years old, his father died and he had to take over the ox cart and the financial responsibility of his family. The economic situation became so bad that in 1937, when he was 25 years old, he joined the Puerto Rico National Guard.

== World War II ==
Rodríguez was assigned to the 65th Infantry Regiment, the all Puerto Rican regiment and was stationed in Panama. When World War II broke out, the 65th Infantry was sent to North Africa. In September 1944, his company landed in Marseille, France, and marched north into Germany without any major incident.

== Korean War ==
After the war, the 65th Infantry was stationed in Puerto Rico. The 65th was activated to the U.S. Army was deployed to Korea attached to the 3rd Infantry Division, upon the outbreak of the Korean War on August 26, 1950. By the time the "Borinqueneers", as the 65th was known, reached Korea, Rodríguez had been promoted to the rank of sergeant.

First Silver Star

Sgt. Rodríguez was a member of Company F and on March 24, 1951, he led his unit to secure Hill 476. When a camouflaged enemy machine gun opened fire on them, Rodríguez led a squad with fixed bayonets in an assault on the area from which the gunfire came from. The enemy fled leaving their supplies behind. For his actions, Rodríguez was awarded his first Silver Star Medal.

2nd Silver Star Medal

A week later on March 31, his company was attacking Hill 398, near Choksong-Myon, when they came under an enemy mortar barrage. After, the enemy pinned down and inflicted heavy casualties on the lead platoon, Rodríguez was ordered to assist the stalled unit and led his platoon in an assault that routed the enemy. For his actions, he was awarded a second Silver Star Medal.

== Citations ==
=== 1st Silver Star ===
The President of the United States of America, authorized by Act of Congress, July 9, 1918, takes pleasure in presenting the Silver Star to Master Sergeant Pedro Rodriguez (ASN: RA-6674697), United States Army, for gallantry in action while serving with Company F, 2d Battalion, 65th Infantry Regiment, 3d Infantry Division, in action against an armed enemy in Korea. On 24 March 1951, near Kopi-Dong, Korea, Sergeant Rodriguez, acting as platoon leader in the absence of a commissioned officer, was leading his unit to secure Hill 476, when the enemy opened fire from a well camouflaged machine gun nest. Although he did not know the exact location of the gun, Sergeant Rodriguez ordered one squad to fix bayonets and assault the general area from which the fire was coming. After the enemy weapon fired again, Sergeant Rodriguez charged the position, yelling and shooting his rifle demoralizing the enemy and causing him to flee in haste, taking his gun with him, but leaving ammunition and rations behind. The gallantry and extreme devotion to duty displayed by Sergeant Rodriguez reflect great credit upon himself and the military service.

=== 2nd Silver Star ===
The President of the United States of America, authorized by Act of Congress, July 9, 1918, takes pleasure in presenting a Bronze Oak Leaf Cluster in lieu of a Second Award of the Silver Star to Master Sergeant Pedro Rodriguez (ASN: RA-6674697), United States Army, for gallantry in action while serving with Company F, 2d Battalion, 65th Infantry Regiment, 3d Infantry Division, in action against an armed enemy in Korea. On 31 March 1951, near Choksong-myon, Korea, Company F was attacking Hill 398, defended by a firmly entrenched enemy supported by mortars. At some distance from the top of the hill, the lead platoon was halted by intense machine gun fire and fragmentation grenades, suffering several casualties. When Sergeant Rodriguez received the order to move his platoon to assist the stalled unit, he ran forward and led his troops in a furious assault, causing the enemy to retreat hastily, thereby relieving the besieged lead platoon. Continuing his charge, Sergeant Rodriguez pursued the fleeing enemy and covered by friendly machine gun fire, he personally searched the area to rout any enemy troops which might have been left behind. The aggressive leadership and personal gallantry exhibited by Sergeant Rodriguez reflect the highest credit upon himself and the military service.

== Military awards and decorations ==

| Badge | Combat Infantryman Badge with star denoting 2nd award | | |
| 1st row | Silver Star with 1 Oak leaf cluster | Bronze Star Medal Retroactively Awarded, 1947 | Purple Heart |
| 2nd row | Army Commendation Medal with 1 Oak leaf cluster | Navy Commendation Medal | Army Good Conduct Medal with 2 Good Conduct Loops |
| 3rd row | American Defense Service Medal with Foreign Service Clasp | American Campaign Medal | European-African-Middle Eastern Campaign Medal with 2 Campaign stars |
| 4th row | World War II Victory Medal | Army of Occupation Medal | National Defense Service Medal with 1 Oak leaf cluster |
| 5th Row | Korean Service Medal with 5 Campaign stars | United Nations Service Medal Korea | Korean War Service Medal Retroactively Awarded, 2003 |
| Unit Awards | Presidential Unit Citation | Meritorious Unit Commendation | Korean Presidential Unit Citation |

== Later years ==
Rodríguez retired from the Army with the rank of Master Sergeant and went to work as a mail carrier for the United States Postal Service in Puerto Rico. In 1979, Rodríguez went to live at the Soldier's and Airmen's Retirement Home in Washington, D.C. In 1977, he had a stroke and other medical complications including the loss of his left leg. Rodríguez died on October 19, 1999, at the age of 88, from a heart attack. He was buried with full military honors at the Arlington National Cemetery. He was married to Asuncion Toro with whom he had five children.

== See also ==
- List of Puerto Ricans
- List of Puerto Rican military personnel
- 65th Infantry Regiment
- Puerto Ricans in World War II
- Borinqueneers Congressional Gold Medal
