= Virgil R. Miller =

United States Army officer (1900–1968)

Virgil Rasmuss Miller
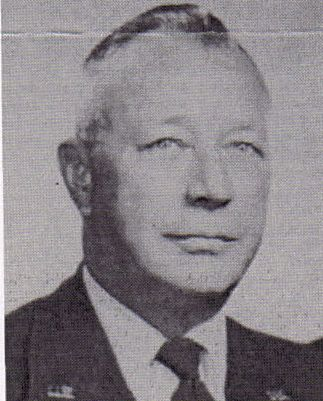
- Born: November 11, 1900; San German, Puerto Rico
- Died: August 5, 1968 (aged 67); Ann Arbor, Michigan
- Burial place: Arlington National Cemetery
- Military career
- Allegiance: United States
- Branch: United States Army
- Service years: 1924–1954
- Rank: Colonel
- Commands: 442nd Regimental Combat Team
- Conflicts: World War II; Battle of Bruyeres; Battle of Rome-Amo; Gothic Line; Spring 1945 offensive in Italy
- Awards: Silver Star; Legion of Merit; Bronze Star (2); Croix de Guerre (France); Croce al Merito di Guerra (Italy)

Virgil Rasmuss Miller (November 11, 1900 – August 5, 1968) was a United States Army officer who served as Regimental Commander of the 442d Regimental Combat Team (RCT), a unit which was composed of "Nisei" (second generation Americans of Japanese descent), during World War II. He led the 442nd in its rescue of the Lost Texas Battalion of the 36th Infantry Division, in the forests of the Vosges Mountains in northeastern France.

== Early years ==
Virgil Miller was born in San German, Puerto Rico, which is located on the western coast of the island. In 1915, his family moved to San Juan, the capital city of the island, when his father Dr. Paul Gerard Miller, was appointed Commissioner of Education, a position which the senior Miller held until 1921. Miller and his siblings received their secondary education at El Caribe High School in San Juan. During World War I, he served in the Puerto Rico Home Guard, a local militia. In 1920, he received an appointment to the United States Military Academy at West Point from Arthur Yager (1858–1941), who served as Governor of Puerto Rico from 1913 to 1921.

== Military career ==
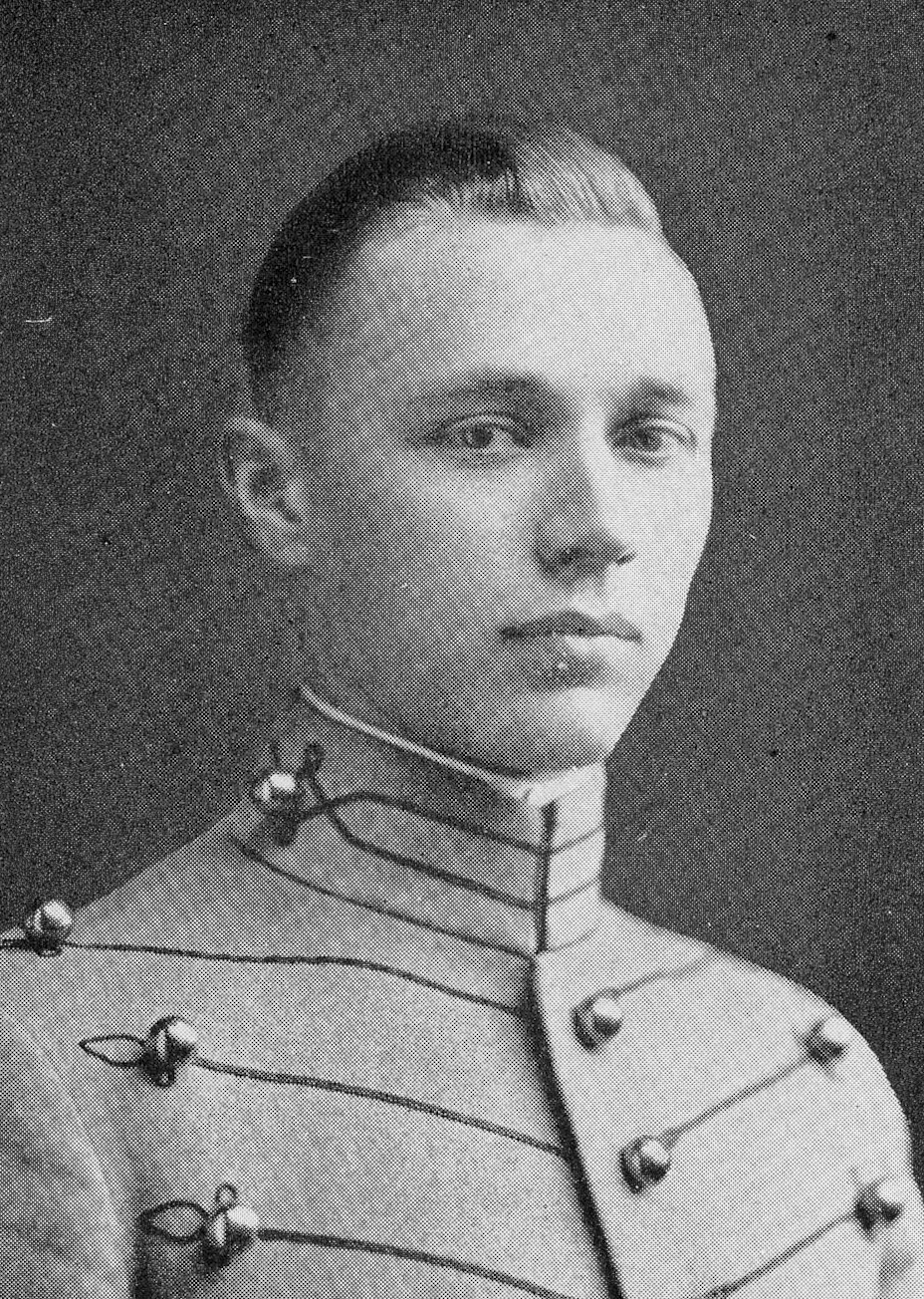
At West Point in 1924

Miller graduated from the U.S. Military Academy and was commissioned a second lieutenant in the infantry in 1924. He married Ann McGoughran the following year and in 1926 returned to Puerto Rico where he served with Puerto Rico's 65th Infantry Regiment at Camp Las Casas. In 1940, he was transferred to Hawaii, where he served with the 21st Infantry Brigade and later with the 24th Infantry Division stationed on the island of Oʻahu at Schofield Barracks.

== World War II ==
On December 7, 1941, the Japanese attacked Pearl Harbor and the United States entered the war. In June 1943, Miller was named Executive Officer of the 442nd Regimental Combat Team. The team included the 442d Infantry Regiment, the 522d Field Artillery Battalion, the 232d Combat Engineer Company, the 206th Army Ground Forces Band and the 100th Infantry Battalion from Hawaii's National Guard. The unit was mostly composed of Nisei, second generation Americans of Japanese ancestry who were drafted into service. Some of these men had family members who were still interned in Japanese American internment camps.

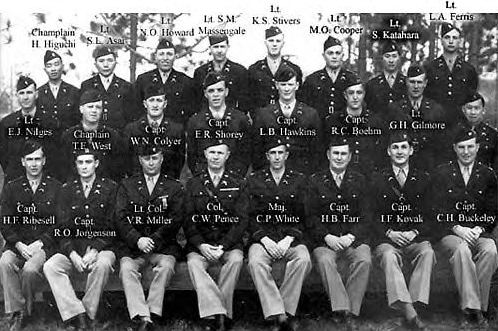
Col. Vigil R. Miller (bottom row, third from left) in 1945 442nd Regimental Staff photo

Among the campaigns in which Miller participated as either Executive Officer or Regimental Commander of the 442nd RCT were the Rome-Amo, North Apennines and Po Valley Campaigns.

=== The Battle of Bruyeres (Rescue of the Lost Battalion) ===
In October 1944, the 1st Battalion, 141st Infantry of the 36th Division, made a push down a long heavily wooded ridge that extended southeast and dominated the valley of Bruyeres, France from Biffontaine to La Houssiere. The 1st had overextended itself behind enemy lines and had been cut off by strong enemy forces. The 442nd, under the leadership of Lieutenant Colonel Miller, was ordered into the line of combat in an effort to relieve pressure on the 1st Battalion.

On October 26, the 442nd launched its attack and at times had to engage in hand-to-hand combat at a terrible cost of men and material. The 442nd Combat Team was badly battered and without reinforcements, however they were committed to their mission of reaching the 1st Battalion, 141st Infantry of the 36th Division which became known as the "Lost Battalion". Finally, on October 30, after five days of combat, the Combat Team made contact and rescued the men of the "Lost Battalion". The 442nd, according to its commander, Lt. Col. Miller, had lost approximately three times more men (over 800 casualties) than the 211 that were eventually saved. Because of intense German attacks, there was little time to celebrate the rescue together. The 442nd were ordered to pursue the Germans and the "Lost Battalion" men were given a hot meal and put on the lines again. 442nd Regimental Commander Colonel Charles W. Pence, was replaced by Lt. Col. Miller who was promoted to Colonel. On January 5, 1945, Miller was named Commanding Officer of Puerto Rico's 65th Infantry Regiment, but he declined the assignment on January 17 because he preferred to continue with the 442nd Combat Team.

=== Silver Star citation ===
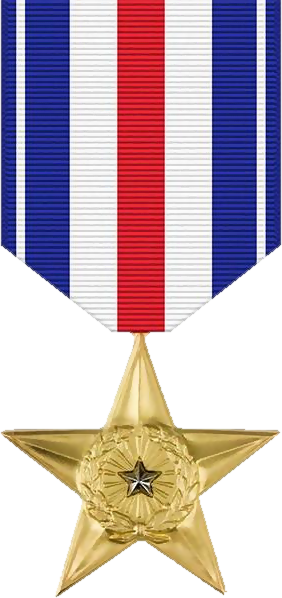

Colonel

Virgil Rasmuss Miller
UNITED STATES ARMY
Company: Commanding Officer
Regiment: 442d Regimental Combat Team
Division: 92d Infantry Division

The President of the United States of America, authorized by Act of Congress, July 9, 1918, takes pleasure in presenting the Silver Star to Colonel (Infantry), [then Lieutenant Colonel] Virgil Rasmuss Miller (ASN: 0-15487), United States Army, for conspicuous gallantry and intrepidity in action against the enemy while Commanding the 442d Regimental Combat Team, attached to the 92d Infantry Division, on 29 October and 7 November 1944, in France, and on 10 April 1945, in Italy. When his troops were halted by a large enemy force defending well dug in positions on a strategic hill in the combat team's four-day battle to rescue the "Lost Battalion," Colonel Miller exposed himself to the hazards of intense artillery, mortar, and small arms fire to personally direct the assault of his companies. On 7 November 1944 in the vicinity of La Croisette, France, when the enemy infiltrated in strength and threatened the entire flank of a battalion, he proceeded to one of the company areas and directed a skillful maneuver which prevented the encirclement of a friendly battalion, Again on 10 April 1945 in the vicinity of Massa, Italy, Colonel Miller proceeded to a company operating on the rearward slope of Cle Tecchione, under concentrated shelling from hostile coastal guns and mortars. Disdaining sporadic shellfire, he inspected the condition of the company, encouraged the troops, and gave the company commander specific instructions on the plan of attack. Colonel Miller's complete disregard for personal safety in repeatedly exposing himself to the hazards of hostile fire in his desire to obtain maximum coordination between the different elements of his command was a constant source of inspiration to the officers and men of his organization and reflects high credit on the traditions of the United States Army. General Orders: Headquarters, 92d Infantry Division, General Orders No. 94 (October 4, 1945) Action Date: 29 October & 7 November 1944, and 10 April 1945.

=== The Po Valley Campaign ===
In April 1945, the 442nd RCT came to the aid of the 92nd Infantry Division and spearheaded a diversionary assault on the western sector of the Gothic Line on the Peninsula Base Section Staging Area at Pisa, Italy.

Field Marshal Albert Kesselring had directed the construction of fortifications, drilled out of solid rock and reinforced with concrete, in the rugged mountains of the Apennines. The German stronghold, contained machine gun nests which produced deadly interlocking fire upon the Allied forces. On April 5, 1945, Col Miller, and 3rd Battalion Commander, LtCol Alfred A. Pursall planned a pincers attack at dawn with the surprise element of an all-night climb of a 3,000-foot (910 m) mountain face in the dark with full fighting gear, to get in position for an assault.

At the dawn of April 6, Miller's men proceeded on their advance, however the explosions of land mines alerted the Germans and a fierce battle followed. The Gothic Line was cracked after a full day of fighting and by the end of the day, the last ridge link, Mount Cerreta, finally fell. Miller then led the 442nd in the capture of Mt. Fologorito, Massa, a German Naval Base at La Spezia (where they captured a submarine) and Turin.

Col. Miller relinquished his command of the 442nd in June 1945. Among the many decorations which Miller's 442nd Regimental Combat Team including the 100th Infantry Battalion and its members earned were: 21 Medals of Honor, 52 Distinguished Service Crosses (including 19 Distinguished Service Crosses which were upgraded to Medals of Honor in June 2000), 1 Distinguished Service Medal, 560 Silver Stars (plus 28 Oak Leaf Clusters for a second award), more than 4,000 Purple Hearts and 7 Presidential Unit Citations (5 earned in one month). It is believed by many that the 442nd is the most decorated unit in U.S. military history.

At a memorial service held on May 6, 1945, for the men of the 442nd RCT, Col. Miller was quoted as saying:

The sacrifice made by our comrades was great. We must not fail them in the fight that continues, in the fight that will be with us even when peace comes. Your task will be the harder and more arduous one, for it will extend over a longer time.

== Later years ==
Miller served in Italy until 1947 and then served as an Infantry advisor in Turkey. He was a Professor of Military Science and Tactics at Pennsylvania State College, Lehigh University and the University of Michigan. Miller retired from the Army in 1954 and as a civilian became a research associate at MIT, a position which he held until his retirement in 1963.

Colonel Miller died on August 5, 1968, in Ann Arbor, Michigan. He was buried with full military honors at Arlington National Cemetery. The Honor Guard carried the 442nd Regimental Colors which was sent by the 442nd Regiment from Schofield Barracks, Hawaii with the assistance of Senator Daniel K. Inouye. Miller was survived by his widow Ann, two sons William and Richard and his daughter Julia.

== Awards and decorations ==
Among Miller's military awards and decorations are the following:

Badge	Combat Infantryman Badge			
1st Row	Silver Star		Legion of Merit	Bronze Star w/ one oak leaf cluster
2nd Row	American Defense Service Medal	American Campaign Medal	Asiatic-Pacific Campaign Medal w/ one bronze service star	European-African-Middle Eastern Campaign Medal w/4 bronze stars
3rd Row	World War II Victory Medal	National Defense Service Medal	French Croix de Guerre w/ Silver Star (France)	Croce al Merito di Guerra (War Merit Cross) -Italy
4th Row	Army Presidential Unit Citation			

== See also ==
- List of Puerto Ricans
- List of Puerto Rican military personnel
- Puerto Ricans in World War I
- Puerto Ricans in World War II
- 65th Infantry
- Borinqueneers Congressional Gold Medal
- German immigration to Puerto Rico
