= Juan E. Negrón =

Puerto Rican Medal of Honor recipient

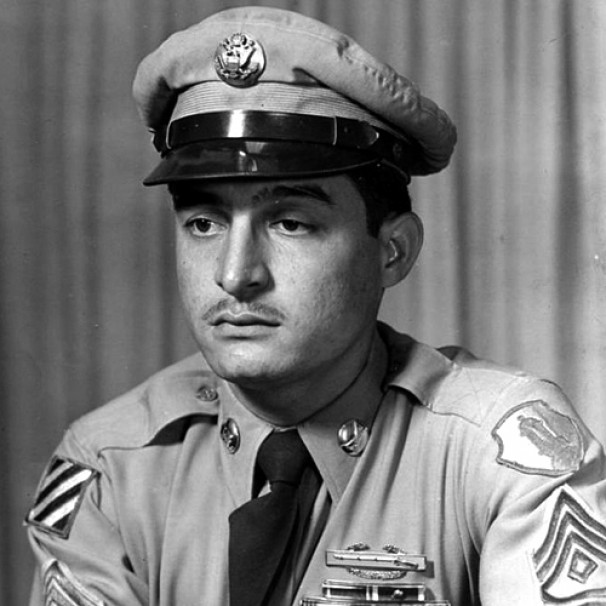
- Master Sergeant Juan E. Negrón
- Born: September 26, 1929; Corozal, Puerto Rico
- Died: March 29, 1996 (aged 66); Bayamón, Puerto Rico
- Burial place: Puerto Rico National Cemetery
- Military career
- Allegiance: United States
- Branch: United States Army
- Service years: 1948–1971
- Rank: Master Sergeant
- Units: 65th Infantry Regiment, 3rd Infantry Division
- Conflicts: Korean War
- Awards: Medal of Honor; Purple Heart (2)

Juan E. Negrón Martínez (September 26, 1929 – March 29, 1996) was a United States Army soldier who served in the 65th Infantry Regiment during the Korean War. He was awarded a Distinguished Service Cross for his actions during combat in the Chinese Spring Offensive at Kalma-Eri, North Korea, on April 28, 1951, which was posthumously upgraded to the Medal of Honor in 2014.

== Early life and military career ==
Juan Enrique Negrón Martínez was born on 26 September 1929, in Corozal, Puerto Rico.

In March 1948, he entered the U.S. Army in San Juan and was assigned to the 65th Infantry Regiment.

Upon the outbreak of the Korean War, the men of the 65th, now attached to the Army's 3rd Infantry Division, deployed to the Republic of Korea. They were among the first infantrymen to meet the enemy on the battlefield. After November 1950, they fought daily against units of the Chinese People's Volunteer Army (PVA) after the Chinese entered the war on the North Korean side. One of the hardships suffered by the Puerto Ricans was the lack of warm clothing during the cold and harsh winters. Among the battles and operations in which the 65th participated was Operation Killer in January 1951, becoming the first regiment to cross the Han River in South Korea during the operation. In April 1951, the regiment participated in the Uijeonbu Corridor drives.

On April 28, 1951, Negrón's unit came under heavy enemy attack. He was able to halt the enemy attack, despite the wounds which he received, by accurately throwing hand grenades at short range. For his actions, he was awarded the Distinguished Service Cross, the Army's second-highest military decoration for heroism.

After the war, Negrón continued to serve in the military. Among the positions which he held were that of senior non-commissioned officer for the Directorate of Doctrine and inspector general in Thailand. Master Sergeant Negrón retired from the U.S. Army in 1971 after 23 years of service.

== Later years ==
Upon his retirement from the United States Army, Negrón entered the federal service in Bayamón, Puerto Rico.

On March 29, 1996, Negrón died in Bayamón, Puerto Rico. He was buried with military honors in plot J 0 3180 of the Puerto Rico National Cemetery located in the city of Bayamon.

== Honors ==
- The Puerto Rico National Guard Readiness Center at Fort Buchanan, Puerto Rico will posthumously be named after Korean War Veteran and former member of the 65th Infantry Regiment and Medal of Honor recipient Master Sergeant Juan E. Negrón.
- A statue in honor of Master Sgt. Juan E. Negron is located in his hometown of Corozal, Puerto Rico.
- In 2017 Juan E. Negrón was posthumously inducted to the Puerto Rico Veterans Hall of Fame.
- In 2022 Master Sergeant Juan E. Negrón was posthumously inducted to the 3rd Infantry Division Marne Hall of Fame.

== Medal of Honor ==
Negron's daughter Iris accepted the Medal of Honor for her late father on March 18, 2014.

In 2014, Negrón's Distinguished Service Cross was upgraded to the Medal of Honor, and presented to his daughter Iris by President Barack Obama in White House ceremony on March 18, 2014.

The award came through the National Defense Authorization Act which called for a review of Jewish American and Hispanic American veterans from World War II, the Korean War and the Vietnam War to ensure that no prejudice was shown to those deserving the Medal of Honor.

Negrón is among three other Puerto Ricans whose Distinguished Service Cross was upgraded to the Medal of Honor, the highest military decoration in the United States. He also has the distinction of being one of nine Puerto Ricans and one of two members of the 65th Infantry Regiment to be honored with the decoration. The second 65th Infantry member was Gen. Richard E. Cavazos, the first Hispanic 4-star general who served as an officer with the unit from 1952–1953. His Distinguished Service Cross was upgraded to the Medal of Honor on January 3, 2025. The award citation content, with the exception of the heading, remains the same as that for the Distinguished Service Cross.

== Medal of Honor citation ==

The President of the United States
in the name of Congress
takes Pride in presenting the

Medal of Honor
(Posthumously)
to

MASTER SERGEANT
JUAN E. NEGRON
UNITED STATES ARMY

For service as set forth in the following citation: The Medal of Honor is posthumously presented to Juan E. Negron (RA10406243), Master Sergeant, U.S. Army, for extraordinary heroism in connection with military operations against an armed enemy of the United Nations while serving with the 65th Infantry Regiment, 3d Infantry Division.

Master Sergeant Negron distinguished himself by extraordinary heroism in action against enemy aggressor forces in the vicinity of Kalma-Eri, Korea, on 28 April 1951. On that date, Sergeant Negron took up the most vulnerable position on his company's exposed right flank after an enemy force had overrun a section of the line. When notified that elements of the company were withdrawing, Sergeant Negron refused to leave his exposed position, but delivered withering fire at hostile troops who had broken through a road block. When the hostile troops approached his position, Sergeant Negron accurately hurled hand grenades at short range, halting their attack. Sergeant Negron held the position throughout the night, while an allied counter attack was organized and launched. After the enemy had been repulsed, fifteen enemy dead were found only a few feet from Sergeant Negron's position. The extraordinary heroism exhibited by Sergeant Negron on this occasion reflects great credit on himself and is in keeping with the finest traditions of the military service.

== Awards and Decorations ==
Negrón's military decorations include:

Badge	Combat Infantryman Badge		
1st row	Medal of Honor Upgraded from DSC, 2014		
2nd row	Purple Heart with 1 oak leaf cluster	Army Good Conduct Medal with 3 Good conduct loops	National Defense Service Medal with 1 Service star
3rd row	Korean Service Medal with 3 Campaign star	Armed Forces Expeditionary Medal	Vietnam Service Medal with 1 Campaign star
4th row	United Nations Service Medal Korea	Korean War Service Medal	Vietnam Campaign Medal
5th row	Army Overseas Service Ribbon with Award numeral 2	Navy Presidential Unit Citation	Cross of Valor
Unit Awards	Korean Presidential Unit Citation		

3rd Infantry Division Insignia

== See also ==
- List of Puerto Ricans
- List of Puerto Rican military personnel
- List of Korean War Medal of Honor recipients
- Puerto Rican recipients of the Medal of Honor
- List of Hispanic Medal of Honor recipients
- Borinqueneers Congressional Gold Medal
