= Antulio Segarra =

United States Army officer (1906–1999)

Antulio Segarra Guiot
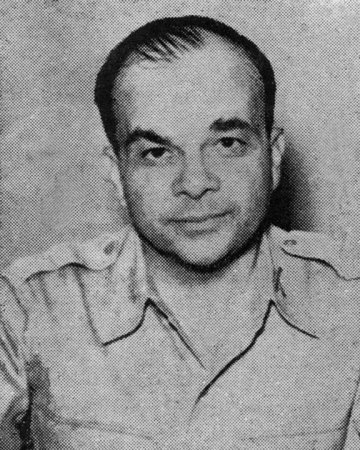
- Colonel Antulio Segarra; First Puerto Rican to command a Regular Army Regiment
- Born: January 20, 1906; Cayey, Puerto Rico
- Died: September 14, 1999 (aged 93); San Juan, Puerto Rico
- Burial place: Puerto Rico National Cemetery in Bayamón, Puerto Rico
- Military career
- Allegiance: United States of America
- Branch: United States Army; Army National Guard
- Service years: 1927–1957
- Rank: Colonel
- Commands: 296th Infantry Regiment; 65th Infantry Regiment; G4 South West Command in Japan
- Conflicts: World War II
- Awards: Legion of Merit (with 1 Oak Leaf Cluster); Army Commendation Medal
- Other work: Vice President for the 1st Federal Savings and Loan Association

Colonel Antulio Segarra Guiot (January 20, 1906 – September 14, 1999) was a United States Army officer who in 1943 became the first Puerto Rican in history to command a Regular Army Regiment. Segarra served as Military Aide to the Military Governor of Puerto Rico Theodore Roosevelt Jr. and during World War II commanded the 65th Infantry Regiment.

== Early years ==
Antulio Segarra was born in Cayey, Puerto Rico where he received his primary and secondary education. His father was Lieutenant Colonel Rafael Segarra, a highly decorated World War I veteran. In 1923, Segarra received an appointment to the United States Military Academy at West Point from Horace Mann Towner (1855–1937), who served as Governor of Puerto Rico from 1923 to 1929.

== Military career ==
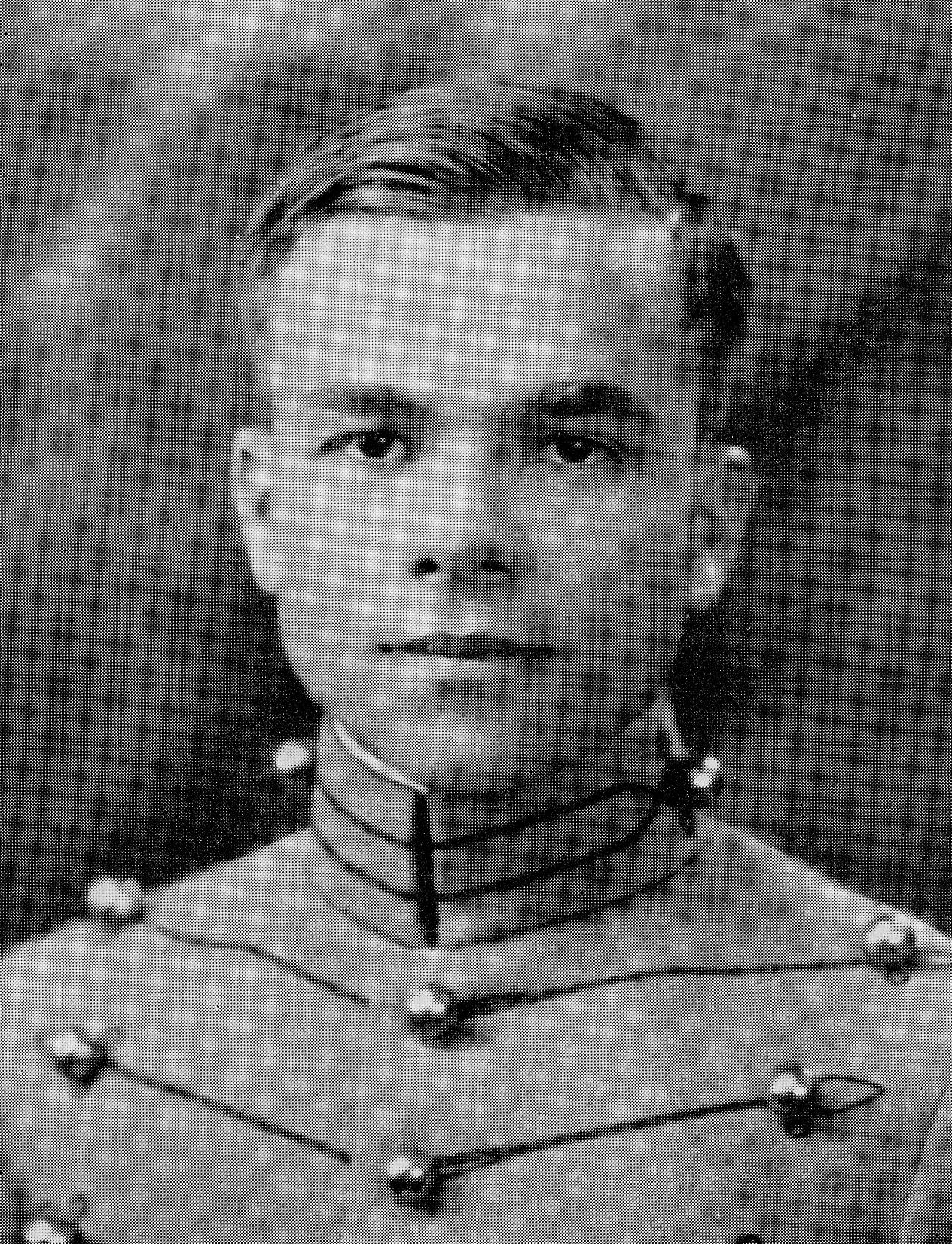
At West Point in 1927

Segarra graduated from West Point in 1927 and was commissioned a Second Lieutenant in the infantry. He was assigned as company commander of the 10th Infantry Regiment, at Fort Knox in Kentucky. The Regiment was later redesignated as the 5th Infantry Division and Segarra served until October 31, 1929, when the regiment was inactivated. He was then assigned as Military Aide to the Military Governor of Puerto Rico Theodore Roosevelt Jr. (1887–1944) and served as such until 1931.

From 1931 to 1932, Segarra served with the 18th Infantry at Fort Wadsworth in Staten Island, New York and with the Camp Dix Civilian Conservation Corps in Burlington County, New Jersey from 1932 to 1936. He continued his military education in the Command and General Staff College (C&GSC) at Fort Leavenworth, Kansas. Segarra graduated from the C&GSC in 1942 and was assigned to the 296th Infantry Regiment of the Puerto Rican National Guard.

== World War II ==
On November 25, 1943, Segarra succeeded Colonel John R. Mendenhall and assumed the command of Puerto Rico's 65th Infantry Regiment which at the time was conducting security missions in the jungles of Panama. Thus, Segarra became the first Puerto Rican Regular Army officer to command a Regular Army Regiment.

In January 1944, the Regiment was embarked for Jackson Barracks in New Orleans and later sent to Fort Eustis in Newport News, Virginia in preparation for overseas deployment to North Africa. After they arrived at Casablanca, they underwent further training. By April 29, 1944, the Regiment had landed in Italy and moved on to Corsica. On June 21, 1944, Segarra was succeeded by Col. Paul G. Daly in the command of the 65th Infantry Regiment.

== Post World War II ==
Segarra was assigned camp commander of Camp Stoneman in San Francisco, California. In 1950, upon the outbreak of the Korean War, Segarra was reassigned and served as troop commander of the men assigned to the 24th Infantry Division who were aboard the USS General E. T. Collins headed for further training in Japan. Segarra served as Camp Commander at the G4 South West Command in Japan until 1951. He returned to Puerto Rico and served as Senior Advisor and Instructor to the Puerto Rico National Guard from 1952 to 1955. From 1955 to 1957, he served in the capacity of Inspector General of the Third United States Army and in the Requirements Section of the National Guard Bureau in Washington, D.C.

== Later years ==
Segarra retired from the military in 1957 and as a civilian worked as vice president for the 1st Federal Savings and Loan Association until 1981 when he retired.

On September 14, 1999, Col. Antulio Segarra, died in San Juan, Puerto Rico and was survived by his wife, Evangelina Ledesma and two children Evangelinita and Antulio Jr. He was buried September 16, with full military honors in the Puerto Rico National Cemetery located in Bayamon, Puerto Rico.

== Awards and decorations ==
Among Segarra's military awards and decorations are the following:

Combat Infantryman Badge
	Legion of Merit with one bronze oak leaf cluster	
Army Commendation Medal	American Defense Service Medal	American Campaign Medal
European-African-Middle Eastern Campaign Medal	World War II Victory Medal	National Defense Service Medal

== See also ==
- List of Puerto Ricans
- List of Puerto Rican military personnel
- Puerto Ricans in World War II
- 65th Infantry Regiment
- French immigration to Puerto Rico
- Borinqueneers Congressional Gold Medal
