= Battle of Jackson Heights =

Battle of the Korean War

Coordinates: 38.333°N 127.254°E

- Part of the Korean War
Date	16–29 October 1952
Location	Northwest of Cheorwon, Korea
Result	Chinese victory

Belligerents
United Nations: United States	China

Commanders and leaders
(United States) Col. Chester B. deGavre	Hwueh Yiang-hua

Units involved
(United States) 65th Infantry Regiment	87th Regiment, 29th Division

The Battle of Jackson Heights was fought between 16 and 29 October 1952 during the Korean War between United Nations Command (UN) and Chinese forces for possession of a UN outpost position. The Chinese successfully seized the position and defended it against UN counterattacks.

== Background ==
While the Chinese People's Volunteer Army (PVA) were preparing their assault on the Republic of Korea Army (ROK) at Baengma-goji (White Horse), they launched several diversionary attacks against ROK outposts on Hills 281 and 391 7 miles (11 km) northeast of White Horse in an attempt to disperse the ROK 9th Infantry Division forces. Sporadic and indecisive fighting continued from 6 to 12 October when the PVA made a serious effort to storm the Hill 391. After the ROK units pulled back, on 13 October a reinforced company from the US 7th Infantry Division attempted in vain to regain the lost positions.

Once the PVA were repulsed at While Horse, the ROK 9th Division sent a battalion from its 28th Regiment to clear Hill 391 on 16 October. The battalion won through to the crest and was able to maintain control until 20 October when PVA counterattacks regained possession of the hill for the next two days. On 23 October, after a bitter hand-to-hand encounter, elements of the ROK 51st Regiment drove the PVA off again, repulsed a counterattack, then withdrew. On the following night the US 65th Infantry Regiment of the 3rd Infantry Division relieved the ROK 51st Regiment on the line.

Since their defeat in the Battle of Outpost Kelly the 65th Regiment had been undergoing a vigorous program of training under a new commander, Colonel Chester B. De Gavre. Two weeks of intensive training, however, could not remedy the basic weakness of the regiment, the lack of experienced noncommissioned officers at the infantry platoon level, but the unit was again assigned to assume responsibility for a portion of the Jamestown Line the UN's main line of resistance.

== Battle ==
On the night of 24-25 October, G Company, under Captain George D. Jackson, took over the defense of the high ground immediately south of Hill 391. Jackson Heights, as it was soon to be called, had enough bunkers to house the command posts of the three rifle platoons, the company headquarters, and the forward artillery observer, but none of these was adequate for fighting off an attack. Jackson's plans for improving his defenses had little chance for early success, since the PVA artillery and mortar fire upon the heights was accurate and the PVA had excellent observation of the G Company movements from the surrounding hills. Facing the company were elements of the PVA 3rd Battalion, 87th Regiment, 29th Division, 15th Army. The 87th Regiment was commanded by Hwueh Yiang-hua.

On the afternoon of the 25th the artillery supporting the 87th Regiment began to send direct 76mm gunfire against the Jackson Heights positions from Camel Back Hill, 2,800 yards (2,600 m) to the northwest. PVA 82mm and 120mm mortars followed and by dusk G Company had received 250 rounds of mortar and artillery fire and suffered nine casualties. During the night the PVA sent out patrols that probed G Company's dispositions and continued to send harassing artillery and mortar fire onto Jackson Heights. Jackson used his own 60mm mortars and supporting mortar and artillery fire to break up the PVA probes. Late in the afternoon of 26 October the PVA sent over 260 rounds of direct 76mm gunfire from Camel Back Hill and caused 14 more casualties. From the company listening posts that night came frequent reports of the PVA moving about and digging in. Two PVA soldiers approached within hand grenade range of one of the listening posts on the southwest flank. The men at the post were given permission to use grenades against the intruders. As the two PVA soldiers hastily withdrew, mortar fire was called in to speed their departure. A PVA platoon probed the northern approach to Jackson Heights shortly after midnight, then fell back under interdicting artillery and mortar fire. Another platoon advanced from the north an hour later and closed to hand grenade range. After a 15-minute fire fight, the PVA pulled back, taking an estimated 17 casualties with them. The next eight hours were relatively quiet.

At 09:30 on 27 October the 76mm guns on Camel Back Hill opened up again. One round scored a direct hit on the mortar ammunition supply and blew up all but some 150 rounds. By nightfall the PVA firepower had reduced the mortar platoon to two mortars and seven men and the second platoon had lost both its platoon leader and sergeant. Jackson reported to 2nd Battalion that he needed aid for his wounded and wanted smoke laid about the heights to obstruct the PVA's ability to pinpoint the company's movements. He was told to be calm, that smoke and aid were on the way. An hour after Jackson called, the PVA loosed a heavy concentration of artillery and mortar fire on G Company's positions and then sent an estimated company in from the north. Using the remaining mortars, automatic weapons, small arms and hand grenades, Jackson and his men beat off this attack. The second PVA assault of the evening came after the Chinese artillery and mortar crews had fired an estimated 1,000 rounds at Jackson Heights within half an hour. One estimated PVA company struck from the north and a second from the south. Jackson called for final defensive fire on the area until the situation clarified. His ammunition dump had been hit again and the PVA attack had fanned out and become general on all sides. At this point the company communications sergeant evidently reported that there were only three men left in the platoon in his area and asked battalion for permission to withdraw. Whether the sergeant acted on his own or not was unclear, but Colonel Carlos Betances Ramirez, the battalion commander, assumed that the request was from the company commander and ordered G Company to withdraw. When Jackson learned of the withdrawal order, he attempted to verify it, but the communications lines were out and radio contact proved unsatisfactory. Jackson passed the order to withdraw back to his platoon leaders. The first and second platoons went down the east side of the heights and Jackson went with the third platoon down the western slope. His platoon ran into heavy PVA small arms fire on the way and he was separated from his men during the action, finally rejoining them on the trail back to the Jamestown Line.

When De Gavre learned of G Company's withdrawal, he quickly ordered that A Company, commanded by 1st Lieutenant John D. Porterfield, be placed under the operational control of Colonel Betances for a counterattack to regain Jackson Heights. A Company was to be used for the attack phase only and F Company, commanded by Captain Willis D. Cronkhite, Jr., would take part in the attack and then would man the outpost. C Company would prepare to pass to the operational control of the 2nd Battalion, if it were necessary to back up the attack. As daylight broke on the 28th, Cronkhite led F Company toward Jackson Heights. The PVA platoon defending the hill resisted with small arms, automatic weapons and hand grenades, but F Company won control of the crest by 10:00. In the meantime, progress by Porterfield's A Company had been slowed down by artillery and mortar fire. Despite the PVA fire, two platoons pushed on and joined F Company on the heights; the remaining platoon was pinned down by mortar fire at the base of the hill. The operation seemed to be well in hand, until the PVA artillery put all of A Company's officers on the hill out of action. One platoon leader was killed by a direct hit and then a shell landed in the middle of the company command post killing Porterfield and the forward observer and wounding the one remaining platoon leader. The loss of leadership became immediately apparent, for enlisted men in both A and F Companies began to "bug out." Slipping away from the heights alone or in groups, the men drifted back toward the Jamestown Line. By late afternoon only Cronkhite and his company officers remained on the hill; all of his men had left along with those of A Company. Efforts by the 2nd Battalion to round up the stragglers and send them back to Jackson Heights met with no success. The men by this time evidently regarded the hill as a suicide post and refused to return. When night fell, Betances ordered Cronkhite and his fellow officers to withdraw from the hill.

On the following day the 65th Regiment made one more effort to take Jackson Heights. De Gavre put Major Davies, the 1st Battalion commander, in charge of the operation. Davies sent C Company to Jackson Heights in the morning of 29 October. The company moved up and took possession of the hill without encountering any enemy resistance. Again all seemed well. The PVA artillery was quiet and no counterattack developed. Suddenly fear set in and the enlisted men left en masse. The command group soon found themselves alone with a handful of men. Once more the stragglers were gathered together and ordered back up the hill and over 50 refused. Davies finally recalled the command group to the Jamestown Line. This proved to be the last attempt of the 65th Regiment to take Jackson Heights. Major general George W. Smythe, the division commander, ordered the US 15th Infantry Regiment to take over responsibility for the 65th's sector beginning that same night.

== Aftermath ==
In November the 65th Regiment returned to an intensive training program. Smythe requested that a combat-trained regiment be either assigned permanently or for at least four months while the 65th Regiment underwent its retraining. If neither of these alternatives were possible, Smythe went on, he favored the reconstitution of the Regiment with 60 percent mainland US personnel and the assignment of the excess Puerto Ricans to other infantry units.

Following the battle 95 soldiers from the 65th Regiment were tried for desertion by General Court-Martial in 15 separate trials. Ninety-one were found guilty and sentenced to prison terms ranging from one to 18 years of hard labor. It was the largest mass court-martial of the Korean War. The convicted soldiers were later granted clemency and pardons following the intervention of the Puerto Rican Government.

Outposts set up on Jackson Heights were subjected to frequent probes by the PVA throughout the first half of November. By the middle of the month only a couple of outposts at the base of Jackson Heights remained in the possession of the 3rd Infantry Division. Although the PVA exerted considerable pressure upon the outposts during the remainder of November and overran them several times, elements of the 15th Regiment managed to maintain their precarious positions at the end of November.
