= Modesto Cartagena =

Recipient of the Purple Heart medal

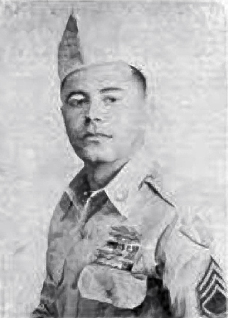
- Sergeant First Class Modesto Cartagena
- Born: July 21, 1921; Cayey, Puerto Rico
- Died: March 2, 2010 (aged 88); Guayama, Puerto Rico
- Burial place: Puerto Rico National Cemetery in Bayamón, Puerto Rico
- Military career
- Allegiance: United States of America
- Branch: United States Army
- Service years: 1942–1945; 1947–1971
- Rank: Sergeant first class
- Unit: 65th Infantry
- Conflicts: World War II; Korean War
- Awards: Distinguished Service Cross; Silver Star; Legion of Merit; Bronze Star (2); Purple Heart

Sergeant First Class Modesto Cartagena de Jesús (July 21, 1921 – March 2, 2010) was a member of the United States Army who served in the 65th Infantry Regiment, a military regiment consisting of Puerto Rican enlisted soldiers and officers from the continental United States also known as "The Borinqueneers," during World War II and the Korean War, becoming the most decorated Hispanic soldier in that war. He is considered the most decorated Puerto Rican soldier of the Korean War.

== Early years ==
Cartagena was born in a poor family, and raised in the mountains of Cayey, Puerto Rico during the Great Depression. In 1940, Cartagena enlisted in the United States Army in San Juan, Puerto Rico and was assigned to the 65th Infantry, also known as The Borinqueneers because, with the exception of the officer staff, it was made up of Puerto Rican enlisted men. During World War II, he was assigned to Company L, 65 Infantry Regiment and was deployed to Europe with the unit. His Third Battalion was assigned to the Seventh United States Army and arrived at the Maritime Alps in 1944 to maintain positions and prevent enemy penetration. The Regimental Commander, Col. George A. Ford, was leading a patrol of 11 men with the mission of capturing a German prisoner. Ford went ahead of his men into the heavily-protected German lines held by the 34th Infantry Division (Wehrmacht) and was killed along with Corporal Aristides Cales-Quiros, who was later awarded a posthumous Silver Star medal. During the machine gun attack, Cartagena gave the sign to "hold and pin down" and ordered firing at the German cable house. He also gave first aid and helped remove the wounded. For this heroic deed, he earned his first Bronze Star for Valor medal. Cartagena was discharged after the 65th Infantry Regiment returned to Puerto Rico in 1945.

== Korean War ==
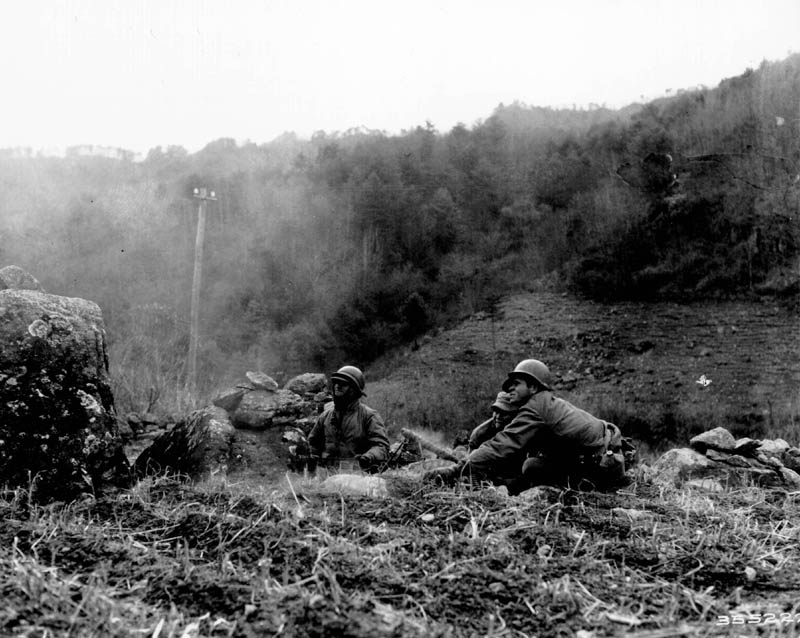
Company "C" on patrol

Cartagena reenlisted in the Army in 1947 and was serving in Company H, 65th Infantry Regiment when he participated in Operation "PORTREX" 65th Infantry Regiment (United States) which took place in Vieques. Upon the outbreak of the Korean War, Cartagena was assigned to Company C, 65th Infantry Regiment, 3rd Infantry Division and sent to Korea.

The men of the 65th, now attached to the army's 3d Infantry Division, were among the first infantrymen to meet the enemy on the battlefields of Korea. After November, 1950, they fought daily against units of the Chinese People's Liberation Army after the Chinese entered the war on the North Korean side. One of the hardships suffered by the Puerto Ricans was the lack of warm clothing during the cold and harsh winters. Among the battles and operations in which the 65th participated was Operation Killer in January 1951, becoming the first regiment to cross the Han River in South Korea during the operation. In April 1951, the Regiment participated in the Uijonbu Corridor drives.

He earned the nickname "One Man Army". On April 19, 1951, Cartagena, "with no regard for his own safety," as the official record states, left his position and charged directly into devastating enemy fire, single-handedly destroying two enemy emplacements on Hill 206 near "Yonch'on," North Korea. After taking out the emplacements, he was knocked to the ground twice by exploding enemy grenades. Nevertheless, he got up and attacked three more times, each time destroying an enemy emplacement until he was wounded. On October 19, 2002, during a ceremony honoring the 65th Infantry, when he was asked about the battle, Cartagena responded that he just hurled back at the Chinese the grenades thrown at him. He thought that the rest of the squad was behind him, and didn't realize most of them had been wounded and forced to take cover. Later they found 33 dead Chinese in the machine gun and automatic emplacements and they found 15 more dead in the positions he had destroyed on his way up the hill. Cartagena, who had lost a lot of blood, was sent to Taibu in a helicopter and then to Japan to the 128th Station Hospital where he was hospitalized for 62 days. According to 1st Lt. Reinaldo Deliz Santiago:

"Sgt. Cartagena's actions prevented much heavier casualties within my platoon and I feel that his courage and superior leadership and own initiative were decisive factors for the accomplishment of the mission of the unit"

Cartagena initially was awarded a Silver Star which was later upgraded to the Distinguished Service Cross, the second-highest military decoration of the United States Army (second to the Medal of Honor), awarded for extreme gallantry and risk of life in actual combat with an armed enemy force.

== Distinguished Service Cross citation ==

Cartagena, Modesto
Citation:

The Distinguished Service Cross is presented to Modesto Cartagena (RA10404100), Sergeant, U.S. Army, for extraordinary heroism in connection with military operations against an armed enemy of the United Nations while serving with Company C, 1st Battalion, 65th Infantry Regiment, 3d Infantry Division. Sergeant Cartagena distinguished himself by extraordinary heroism in action against enemy aggressor forces in the vicinity of Yonch'on, Korea, on 19 April 1951. On that date, Company C was assigned the mission of capturing Hill 206, a terrain feature dominating a critical road junction. When the company assaulted the summit, it encountered stubborn resistance from a well-entrenched and fanatically determined hostile force. Sergeant Cartagena, directed to move his squad forward in order to approach the enemy positions from another ridgeline, led his men toward the objective, but, almost immediately, the group was forced to seek cover from an intense and accurate volume of small-arms and automatic-weapons fire. Locating the hostile emplacements that posed the greatest obstacle to the advance of the friendly forces, Sergeant Cartagena left his position and, charging directly into the devastating enemy fire he hurled a grenade at the first emplacement, totally destroying it. Ordering his squad to remain under cover, he successfully and single-handedly assaulted the second enemy position. Although knocked to the ground by exploding enemy grenades, Sergeant Cartagena repeated this daring action three more times. Finally, an increased volume of fire from the remaining hostile emplacements was concentrated on him and he was wounded. The extraordinary heroism and completely selfless devotion, to duty displayed by Sergeant Cartagena throughout this action enabled the company to secure its objective successfully with a minimum of casualties, reflect great credit on himself and are in keeping with the highest traditions of the military service. Headquarters, Eighth U.S. Army, Korea: General Orders No. 698 (September 16, 1951) Home Town: Puerto Rico

== Later Years ==
Cartagena spent 20 years in the army before retiring as a sergeant first class in 1971. He continued to be an active figure around the 65th Infantry headquarters in Puerto Rico long after his retirement. He also had family in El Paso, Texas. His family, upon learning of Modesto's actions, had taken it upon themselves to make a request to Congress that he be awarded the Medal of Honor. They received support on this quest from the Republican Veterans Committee. His supporters argued that the segregation policy of the army, at the time, and the limited English capacity of his company members when filling out the forms for the application, resulted in the awarding of the nations' second-highest decoration, the Distinguished Service Cross.

On March 2, 2010, the day that Puerto Rico commemorated the 93rd anniversary of American citizenship, Cartagena died in his home in the town of Guayama, of a heart attack following a long battle with stomach cancer, he is survived by his sisters María and Virginia and his children Modesto Jr., Luis Antonio, Fernando, Sara, Wilma and Víctor. Cartagena was buried with military honors in the Puerto Rico National Cemetery located in the city of Bayamon. While no Federal government representative attended the interment ceremony for this highly decorated veteran, Puerto Rico's second-highest official, Secretary of State Kenneth McClintock attended. He delivered to Cartagena's family a personal letter from Governor Luis Fortuño and stated that while Cartagena was actually being buried with a Distinguished Service Cross, "in our hearts we're sending him off with the Medal of Honor he deserves" and made a commitment to seek it posthumously.

== Military awards and decorations ==
According to a photo published by the New York Times, Cartagena's numerous decorations are the following:

Badge	Combat Infantryman Badge (2nd award)		
1st Row	Distinguished Service Cross		Silver Star Medal
2nd Row	Legion of Merit	Bronze Star Medal with Valor device and one bronze oak leaf cluster	Purple Heart
3rd Row	Army Good Conduct Medal with 3 Good Conduct Loops	American Defense Service Medal	American Campaign Medal
4th Row	European–African–Middle Eastern Campaign Medal with 4 Campaign stars	World War II Victory Medal	Army of Occupation Medal
5th Row	National Defense Service Medal with 1 Service star	Korean Service Medal with 1 Silver star	United Nations Service Medal Korea
6th Row	Korean War Service Medal Retroactively Awarded, 2003	Army Service Ribbon	Army Overseas Service Ribbon with Award numeral 2
Unit awards	Republic of Korea Presidential Unit Citation	Army Meritorious Unit Commendation	Army Presidential Unit Citation
Badge	Sharpshooter Marksmanship badge for rifle		

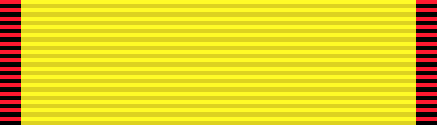

Military Medal of Honor Puerto Rico	Cross of Valor Greece

== Legacy ==
January 4, 2007, was officially declared as "SFC Modesto Cartagena Day" in the city of Hartford, Connecticut. The proclamation by Mayor Eddie A. Perez can be viewed here: "SFC Modesto Cartagena Day" Proclamation. An avenue in his native town of Cayey is named after him.

On April 14, 2021, USAG Fort Buchanan dedicated the base Visitor Control Center building in honor of SFC Modesto Cartagena.

In 2019 Modesto Cartagena was posthumously inducted to the Puerto Rico Veterans Hall of Fame.

== See also ==
- List of Puerto Ricans
- List of Puerto Rican military personnel
- Puerto Rican recipients of the Distinguished Service Cross
