= Henry Barracks, Puerto Rico =

United States Army base located in Cayey, Puerto Rico

Henry Barracks
- Cayey, Puerto Rico
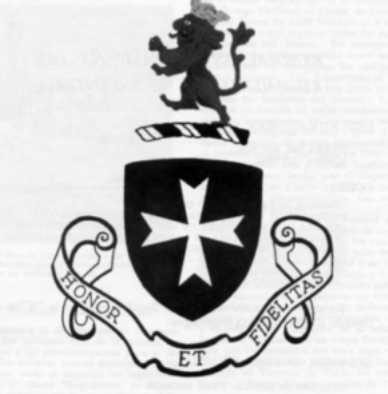
- 65th Infantry coat of arms

Site information
- Type: Former Military Base
- Controlled by: Formerly by the U.S. Army

Site history
- Built: 1898
- In use: 1898-1965

Garrison information
- Garrison: 65th Infantry Regiment

Henry Barracks was a United States Army base located in Cayey, Puerto Rico named after the 3rd Military Governor of Puerto Rico and Medal of Honor recipient Major General Guy V.Henry.

== History ==
This base in the Central Mountain range of Puerto Rico located 25 miles (40 km) from San Juan, Puerto Rico was under control of the Spanish army until the United States Army took over the base in 1898 during the Spanish–American War. It became a Puerto Rico Voluntary Regiment Post. 1908 became a United States Army infantry base for the 65th Infantry Regiment.

In 1900 the site was renamed Henry Barracks after the 3rd Military Governor of Puerto Rico Major General Guy Vernor Henry.

In the beginning the base consisted of 439.92 acres of land situated in the east side of the town of Cayey. The property was divided into three encampments: the Spanish Camp- Campamento Español also known as Hospital Hill (15 acres), the Henry Barracks main post in the northern part consisted of 372 acres and the home for the third Battalion of the 65th Infantry Regiment, and the United States Navy Cayey Naval Radio Station (67 acres).

By 1920 Henry Barracks became a sub-post attached to Fort Brooke in San Juan where the 65th Infantry First Battalion were posted.

Some units from the 65th Infantry were mobilized to World War II and the Korean War from Henry Barracks. A large number of soldiers from the 65th Infantry were native Puerto Ricans.

In 1928 Hurricane San Felipe hit Puerto Rico and destroyed many of the base's wooden structures. The Navy left Cayey as a result of the damage from Hurricane San Felipe and moved to Naval Air Station Isla Grande in San Juan. All the land held by the Navy to include Magazine Hill (El Polvorin) were absorbed by the U. S. Army. In 1929 new permanent buildings were constructed at the Henry Barracks.

After the Korean War the U.S. Army brought in troops not native to Puerto Rico. They were called "Continentals" by the locals from Cayey Puerto Rico. By that time the combat troops stationed at Henry Barracks consisted of an artillery battalion and a heavy mortar company.

== Base Closing ==
In 1953, the U.S. Army reached the conclusion that Henry Barracks would be closed in the near future. A full complement of the Army phased out its presence at the post in 1965 when the base was transferred to the General Services Administration for decommission. Burials ceased at the Henry Barracks military cemetery in 1965 and the graves were moved to the Puerto Rico National Cemetery. Most of the land and buildings were transferred to the University of Puerto Rico and opened the University of Puerto Rico at Cayey campus in 1967 while other facilities were transferred to the municipality of Cayey, Puerto Rico.

Most of the land and buildings that was transferred to the municipality of Cayey were turned into sports facilities.

== National Guard ==
The Military keep one parcel from the Henry Barracks army base for the Puerto Rico National Guard 1st Battalion, 65th Infantry Regiment Headquarters and Headquarters Company, and the 105th Forward Support Company. A heliport, maintenance shop, administration offices and a NGX PX are some of the facilities at the National Guard post use mostly for monthly drills.

== Army ROTC ==
The University of Puerto Rico at Cayey hosted the U.S. Army Reserve Officers Training Course ROTC program at a site in the former Herry Barracks base. The Army ROTC had an office, several classrooms, an obstacle course and a rappeling tower.

== Tribute ==
A monument to honor Military Veterans from Cayey stands near the Herry Barracks housing area and of the main roads of the former Army base was renamed Avenida Los Veteranos (Veterans Avenue).

== See also ==
- List of Puerto Ricans Missing in Action in the Korean War
- 65th Infantry Regiment
- Camp Las Casas
- List of Puerto Rican military personnel

Other military articles related to Puerto Rico:

- Military history of Puerto Rico
- Puerto Rican Campaign
- Puerto Ricans in World War I
- Puerto Ricans in World War II
- Puerto Ricans in the Vietnam War
- Puerto Rican women in the military
- Puerto Rico National Guard
