= 65th Infantry Regiment (United States) =

Puerto Rican regiment of the United States Army

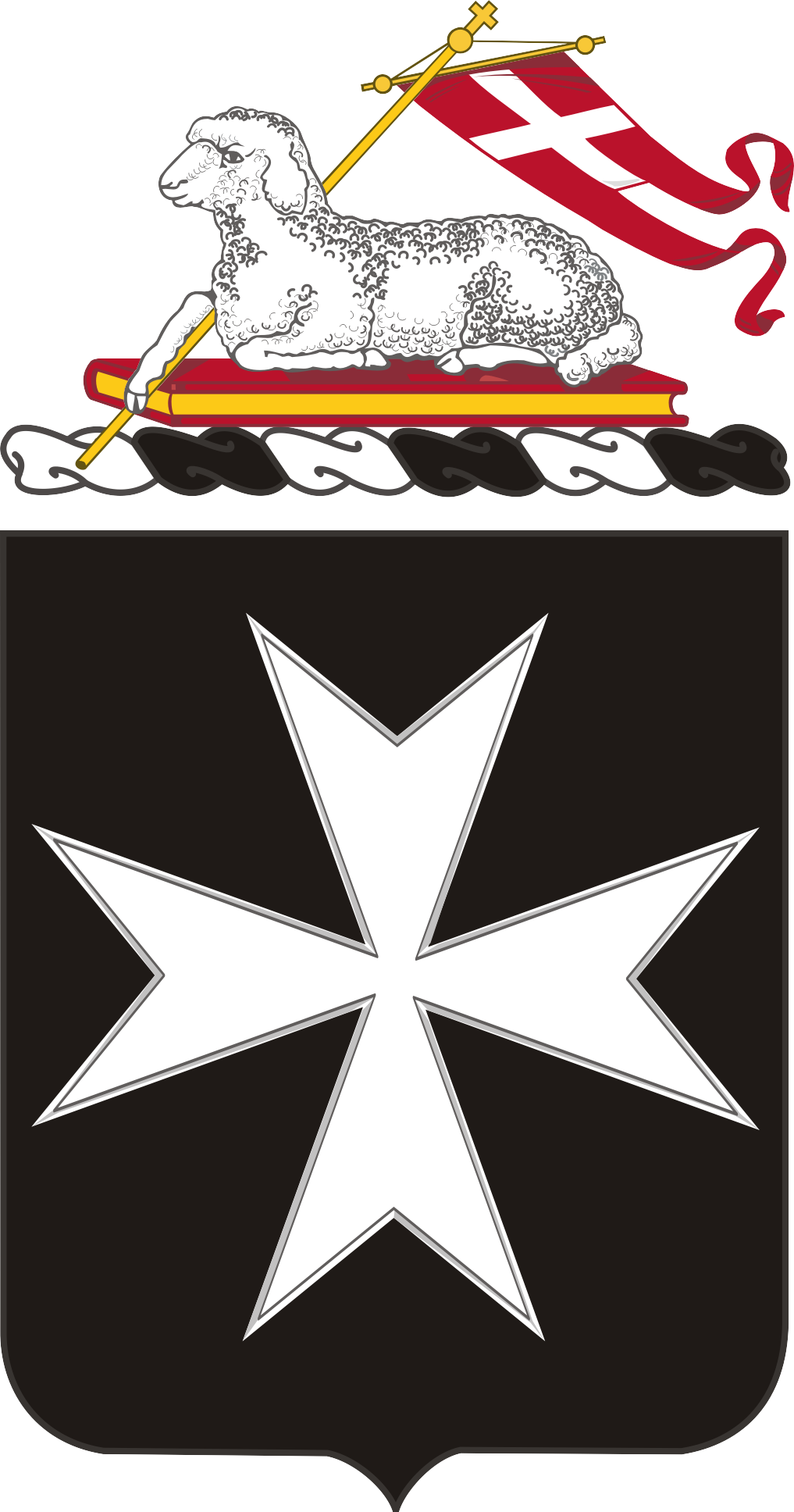
- Coat of arms
- Founded: 1899–1956; 1959–Present
- Country: United States
- Branch: United States Army
- Type: Infantry
- Nickname: "Borinqueneers" (special designation)
- Mottos: Honor and Fidelity
- Engagements: World War I; World War II; Naples-Foggia; Central Europe; Battle of the Rhineland; Korean War; Operation Killer; Battle of Cherwon; Jackson Heights; Outpost Kelly

Commanders
- Notable commanders: Col. Antulio Segarra; Col. Juan César Cordero Dávila; Col. William W. Harris; Col. Chester B. deGavre

Insignia
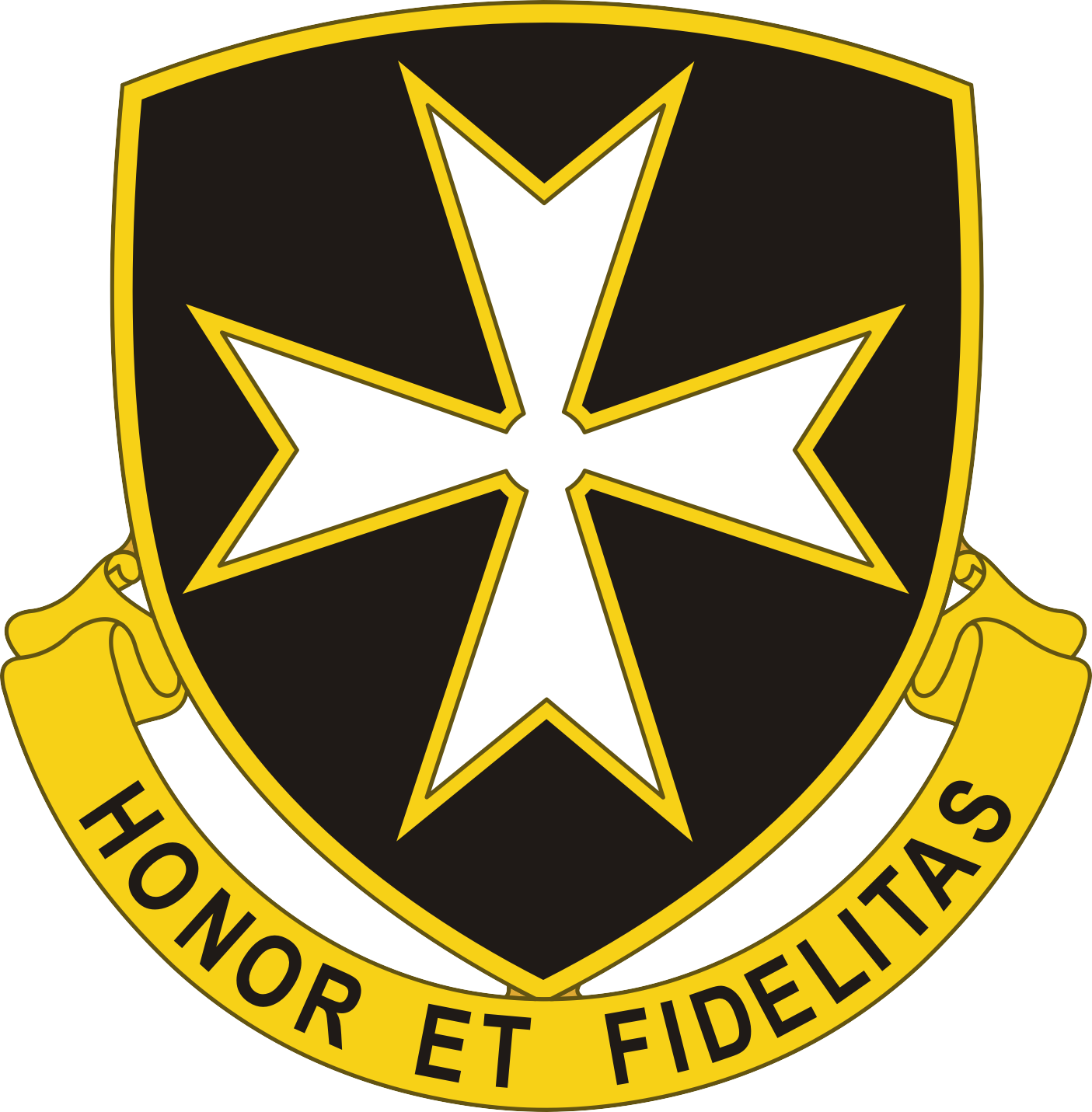
- Distinctive unit insignia

The 65th Infantry Regiment, nicknamed "the Borinqueneers" during the Korean War for the original Arawak Native Taino name for Puerto Rico (Borinquen), is a Puerto Rican regiment of the United States Army. The regiment's motto is Honor et Fidelitas, Latin for Honor and Fidelity. The Army Appropriation Bill created by an act of Congress on 2 March 1899 authorized the creation of the first body of native troops in Puerto Rico. On 30 June 1901, the "Porto Rico Provisional Regiment of Infantry" was organized. On 1 July 1908, Congress incorporated the regiment into the Regular Army as the Puerto Rico Regiment of Infantry, United States Army. On 14 May 1917, the regiment was activated and additional men were assigned, with the unit being sent to serve at Panama. On 4 June 1920, the regiment was renamed 65th Infantry. During World War II, the regiment saw action throughout Europe, especially France and Germany, participating in Naples-Foggia, Rome-Arno and Rhin. Several Purple Hearts were awarded posthumously to members of the 65th Regiment.

The 65th Infantry Regiment participated in World War I, World War II, the Korean War, and the Global War on Terrorism. On 10 June 2014, the 65th Infantry was awarded the Congressional Gold Medal.

== Early history ==
Puerto Ricans have participated in many of the military conflicts in which the United States has been involved. For example, they participated in the American Revolutionary War, when volunteers from Puerto Rico, Cuba, and Mexico enlisted in the Spanish Army in 1779 and fought under the command of General Bernardo de Gálvez (1746–1786), and have continued to participate up to the present-day conflicts in Iraq and Afghanistan. Puerto Rico became a U.S. Territory after the 1898 Treaty of Paris which ended the Spanish–American War. The United States appointed a military governor and soon the United States Army established itself in San Juan.

On 2 March 1899, the Army received an assignation of funds and authorization meant to formally organize troops in Puerto Rico. On 24 March 1899, the General Commander of the Puerto Rico Department, Mayor General Guy V. Henry ordered the creation of the Porto Rico Battalion of Volunteer Infantry. Formed by four companies named A through D and assigned to San Juan, Mayagüez and Ponce, the unit was activated on 20 May 1899, led by Major Lorenzo Davinson. Shortly afterwards, each company received additional men for a total of 112. Major Ebon Swift replaced Davison as commander. The formalization of this move was notified in General Order 65, issued by the new General Commander Gen. George Davis. On 12 February 1900, the Mounted Battalion was organized and both were later designated Porto Rico Regiment, U.S. Volunteers. The following year, the units were renamed Porto Rico Provisional Regiment of Infantry. The Band and First Battalion were sent to Washington on 4 March 1901, to participate in the inauguration of McKinley.

On 1 July 1901, the United States Senate passed a bill which would require a strict mental and physical examination for those who wanted to join the regiment. It also approved the recruitment of native Puerto Rican civilians to be appointed the grade of second lieutenants for a term of four years if they passed the required tests. On 23 April 1904, Congress authorized the recruitment of the local population as second lieutenants, leading to the recognition of Jaime Nadal, Henry Rexach, Pedro Parra, Eduardo Iriarte, Teofilo Marxuach, Eugenio Carlos de Hostos, Luis Emmanuelli and Pascual López. In 1905, one of its battalions was sent to March along the First a Brigade of the First Division of the Regular Army during Roosevelt's inauguration. An act of Congress, approved on 27 May 1908, reorganized the regiment as part of the "regular" Army and the "Porto Rico Provisional Regiment of Infantry" was renamed "Porto Rico Regiment of Infantry". Since the native Puerto Rican officers were Puerto Rican citizens and not citizens of the United States, they were required to undergo a new physical examination to determine their fitness for commissions in the Regular Army and to take an oath of U.S. citizenship with their new officers oath. By 30 January 1917, the Porto Rico Regiment of Infantry was training in Camp Las Casas which was located in Santurce, a section of San Juan in what is now Residencial Las Casas.

== World War I ==
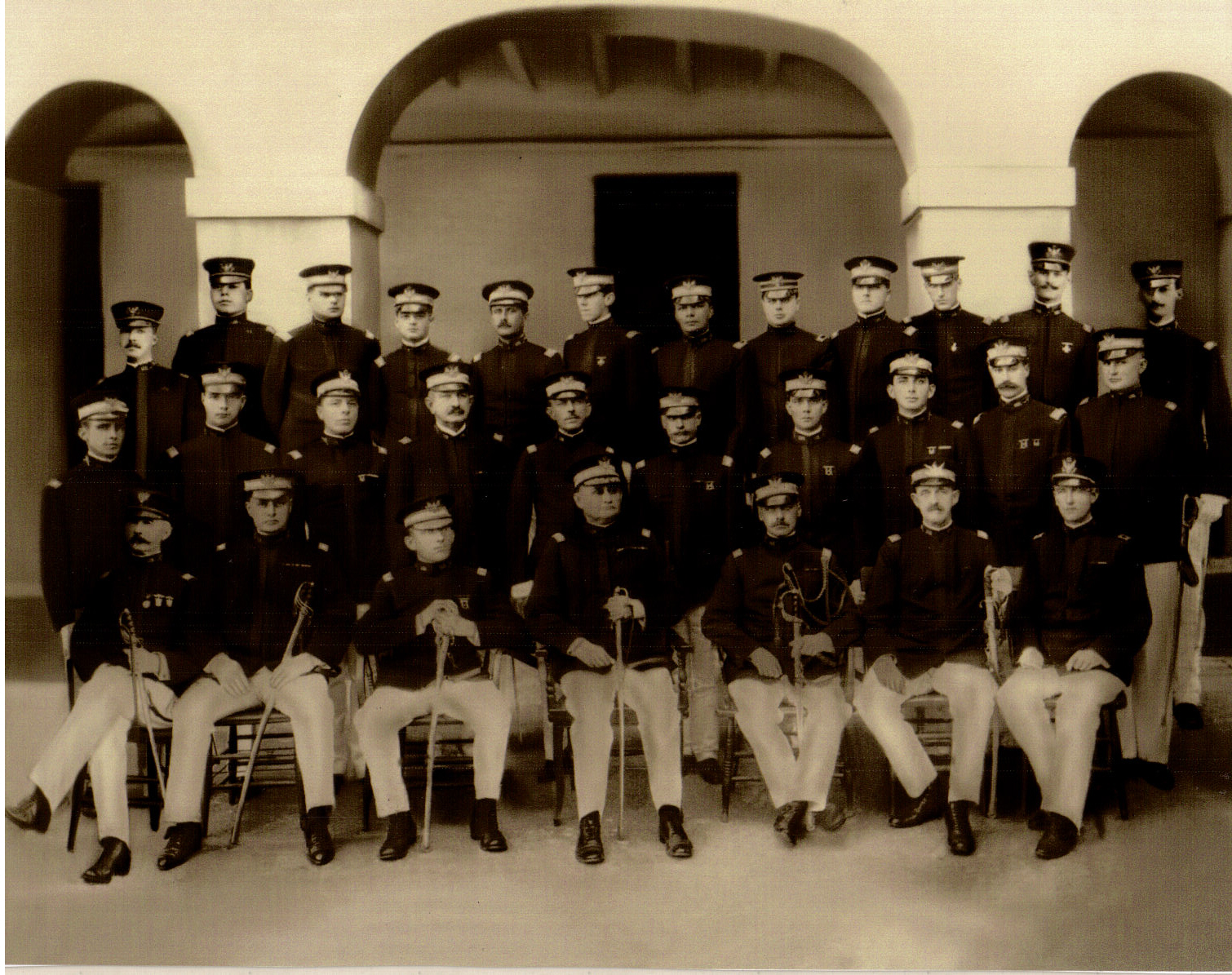
Officer Staff of the Porto Rico Infantry (cir. 1906) Lt. Teófilo Marxuach pictured on top row, fifth L-R

Different units of the regiment were stationed at other forts throughout the island under the command of William P. Burnham. Lieutenant Teófilo Marxuach, the officer of the day, was stationed at El Morro Castle at San Juan Bay on 21 March 1915. The Odenwald, built in 1903 (not to be confused with the German World War II war ship which carried the same name), was an armed German supply ship which tried to force its way out of the San Juan Bay and deliver supplies to the German submarines waiting in the Atlantic Ocean. Marxuach gave the order to open fire on the ship from the walls of the fort. Sergeant Encarnación Correa then manned a machine gun and fired warning shots with little effect.

Marxuach fired a warning shot from a cannon located at the Santa Rosa battery of El Morro fort, in what is considered to be the first shot of World War I fired by the regular armed forces of the United States against a ship flying the colors of the Central Powers, forcing the Odenwald to stop and to return to port where its supplies were confiscated.

Casing of the shell fired at the Odenwald

The Odenwald was confiscated by the United States and renamed SS Newport News. It was assigned to the U.S. Shipping Board, where it served until 1924 when it was retired.

Puerto Ricans were unaccustomed to the racial segregation policies of the United States which were also implemented in Puerto Rico, and often refused to designate themselves as "white" or "black". Puerto Ricans of African descent were assigned to all-black units. In 1916, the Third Battalion and the companies of service and machine-guns were integrated into the regiment.

When the United States declared war against Germany, the regiment was transferred to the regular Army and on 3 May 1917, recruited 1,969 men, considered at that time as war strength.

On 14 May 1917, the regiment was sent to Panama in defense of the Panama Canal Zone. The regiment returned to Puerto Rico in March 1919.

== Interwar period ==
The regiment was stationed at San Juan as of June 1919. During this period, a young Puerto Rican Regular Army officer, Major Luis R. Esteves, was sent to Camp Las Casas to serve as an instructor to Puerto Rican officers; in the future, Esteves would become known as the "Father of the Puerto Rican National Guard". The regiment was redesignated the 65th Infantry Regiment on 14 September 1920; it was numbered in succession of the sixty-four regiments of Regular Army infantry originally authorized by the National Defense Act of 1916. In 1923, the 65th provided personnel to the newly created 42nd Infantry Regiment; the personnel of the 65th rotated on four-year tours with the personnel of the 42nd in Panama, until the latter unit was inactivated in 1927. The mobilization assignment of the 65th Infantry from 1922-28 was to reinforce the Panama Canal Division's 20th Infantry Brigade in the Canal Zone. The regiment was ordered to perform emergency relief work in the vicinity of Cayey—San Juan after a major hurricane struck the island on 12 September 1928. As part of this mission, units of the regiment rebuilt the road from Cayey to San Juan from 13 September to 1 December 1928. The 3rd Battalion was inactivated 31 July 1931 at Henry Barracks. Concurrently, the 1st Battalion was transferred to Henry Barracks. Company D was awarded the Edwin Howard Clark trophy for machine gun marksmanship for 1937. Assigned Reserve officers conducted summer training with the regiment at Camp Buchanan, and also conducted infantry Citizens Military Training Camps at Camp Buchanan in 1938 and 1939. The regiment embarked on the battleship USS Wyoming to St. Croix and St. Thomas, United States Virgin Islands, as part of a joint defensive exercise from 8 December 1939–7 January 1940. The regiment was transferred on 1 February 1940, less the 1st and 2nd Battalions, to Fort Buchanan. The 3rd Battalion was concurrently activated at Fort Buchanan and the 1st Battalion was transferred to Borinquen Field.

== World War II ==
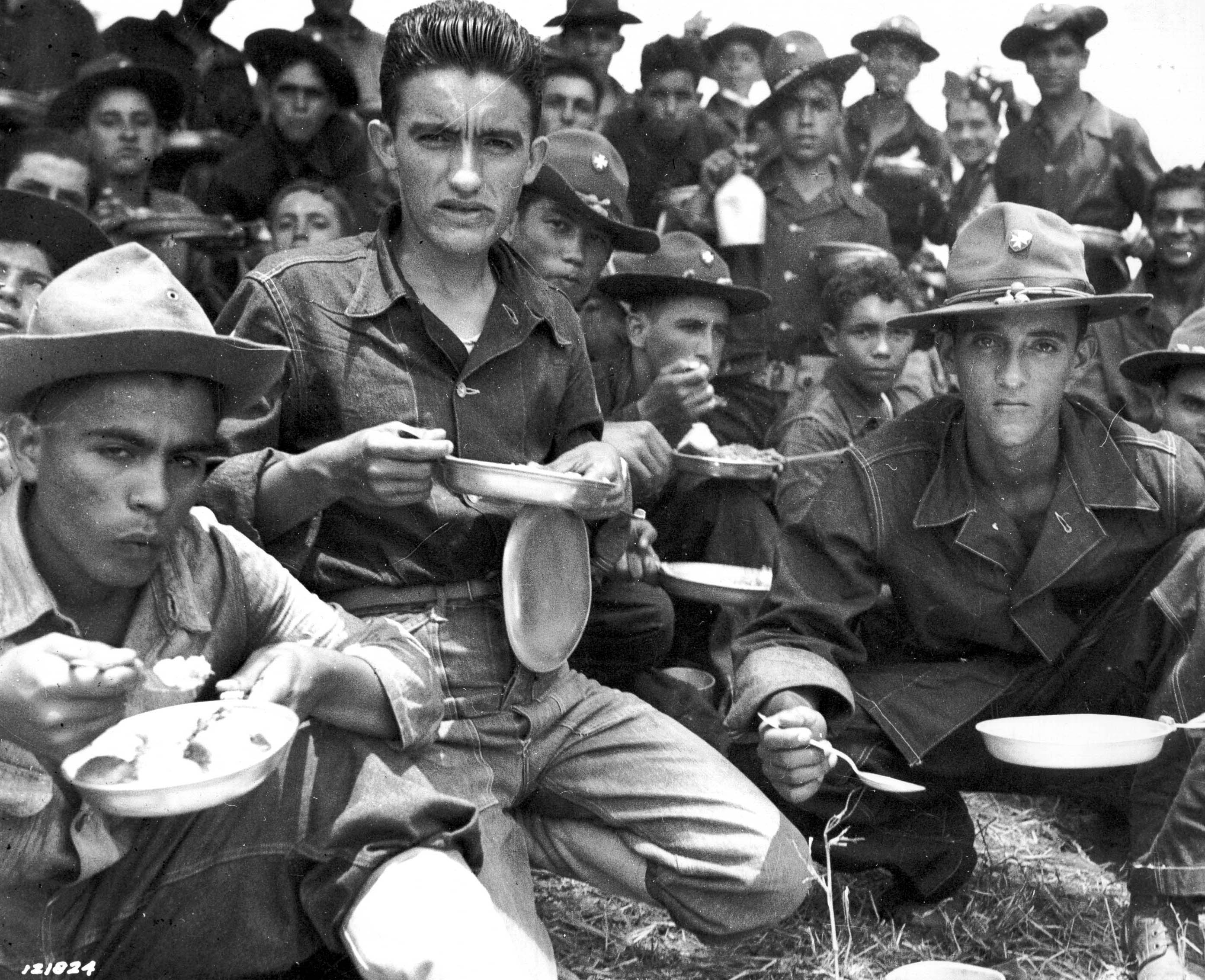
Soldiers of the 65th Infantry training in Salinas, Puerto Rico. August 1941.

After American entry into World War II, the 65th Infantry remained in the vicinity of Fort Buchanan until it was transferred to Camp Tortuguero in November 1942. The regiment was then again sent to Panama to defend the Canal Zone. On 25 November 1943, Colonel Antulio Segarra, succeeded Colonel John R. Menclenhall as commander of the 65th Infantry, becoming the first Puerto Rican Regular Army officer to command a Regular Army regiment. On 21 January 1944, the regiment arrived at New Orleans, Louisiana, and was sent less than two weeks later to Fort Eustis, near Newport News, Virginia in preparation for overseas deployment to North Africa.

Individual awards in World War II
Award	Name	Total
	Silver Star	2
	Bronze Star	22
	Purple Heart	90

The regiment remained at Fort Eustis until it departed the Hampton Roads Port of Embarkation on 26 March 1944, arriving in North Africa on 5 April 1944. The regiment underwent amphibious training. Between March and April 1944, the 65th was reassigned to North Africa. On 3 May 1944, the Third Battalion arrived at Napoli. The battalion was then moved to Corsica and then to France. Salvador Roig commanded the 65th during this period in Europe, which earned him the Combat Infantryman Badge. The 3rd Battalion was sent to Corsica, where it was attached to the 12th Air Force and tasked with guarding airfields. During this time, rumors swirled that the regiment would be sent into combat, while officers had already been moved to act as observers. On 22 September 1944, the 65th Infantry landed in France. The regiment was then moved to Peira Cava in the Maritime Alps, where it entered in action on 13 December 1944, the first time a Puerto Rican unit saw action in Europe. The first offensive attack came the following day in response to enemy fire, with Lieutenant Colonel Juan César Cordero Dávila allowing Capt. Efraín Sánchez Hidalgo and Company L to return fire.

In November 1944, Company C provided security to the headquarters of the Seventh United States Army. The rest of the First Battalion was assigned other tasks, such as defending the Command Center of the Sixth United States Army Group. The Second and Third Battalions were assigned to defend communications. In 1948, seven members received the Bronze Star for their service in World War II. On 13 December 1944, the 65th Infantry, under the command of Lieutenant Colonel Cordero Dávila, relieved the 2nd Battalion of the 442nd Infantry Regiment, a regiment which was made up of Japanese Americans under the command of Col. Virgil R. Miller, a native of San Germán, Puerto Rico and former member of the 65th Infantry Regiment.

In December 1944, the 3rd Battalion faced the German 34th Infantry Division's 107th Grenadier Regiment. They suffered a total of forty seven battle casualties. The first two Puerto Ricans to be killed in action from the 65th Infantry were Pvt. Sergio Sánchez-Sánchez and Sgt. Ángel Martínez, from the town of Sabana Grande. Upon arriving in the freezing and isolated outposts in the Maritime Alps, the unit's morale dropped severely. In an apparent effort to boost the unit's morale, its new commander, West Pointer Colonel George A. Ford, personally led a patrol towards the German lines on 4 January 1945. Upon reaching the forward German outposts, Colonel Ford was immediately shot and killed. In the firefight that followed, one of the enlisted man already mentioned was killed and several other were wounded, forcing the patrol to abandon the colonel's body.

On 18 March 1945, the regiment was sent to the district of Mannheim, Germany and assigned to military government activities, anti-sabotage and security missions. In all, the 65th Infantry participated in the campaigns of Rome-Arno, Rhineland, Ardennes-Alsace, and Central Europe. On 27 October 1945, the regiment sailed from France arriving at Puerto Rico on 9 November 1945.

== Operation "PORTREX" ==
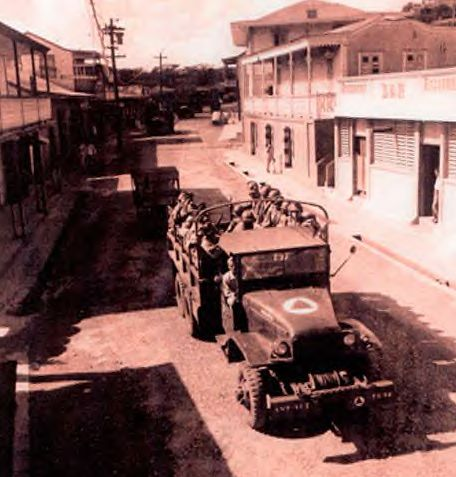
65th Infantry troops convoyed through Isabel Segunda for PORTREX.

External videos
- Newsreel footage of Operation Portrex

The 65th Infantry Regiment distinguished itself when the United States conducted a military exercise on the island of Vieques, on the eve of the Korean War. This exercise was code named "Operation PORTREX", an acronym for "Puerto Rico Exercise". The objective was to see how the combined forces of the Army, Marines, Navy, and Air Force would do as "liberators" of an enemy captured territory (Vieques) against the "aggressors". The core of the aggressor ground forces were made up of Puerto Rican soldiers, most of whom belonged to the 65th Infantry Regiment.

The liberators consisted of 32,600 combat troops from the 82nd Airborne Division's 504th Airborne Infantry Regiment and the Marine Corps, who received support from the Navy and Air Force. Despite the large number of troops deployed, the 65th Infantry (the aggressor) was able to halt the offensive forces on the beaches of the island. Colonel William W. Harris, the commanding officer of the 65th, stated:

"Stopping the assault forces at the water's edge proved that the Puerto Ricans could hold their own against the best-trained soldiers that the United States Army could put into the field."

The successful military maneuvers during PORTREX prompted the Army's leadership to deploy the 65th Infantry to Korea.

== Korean War ==
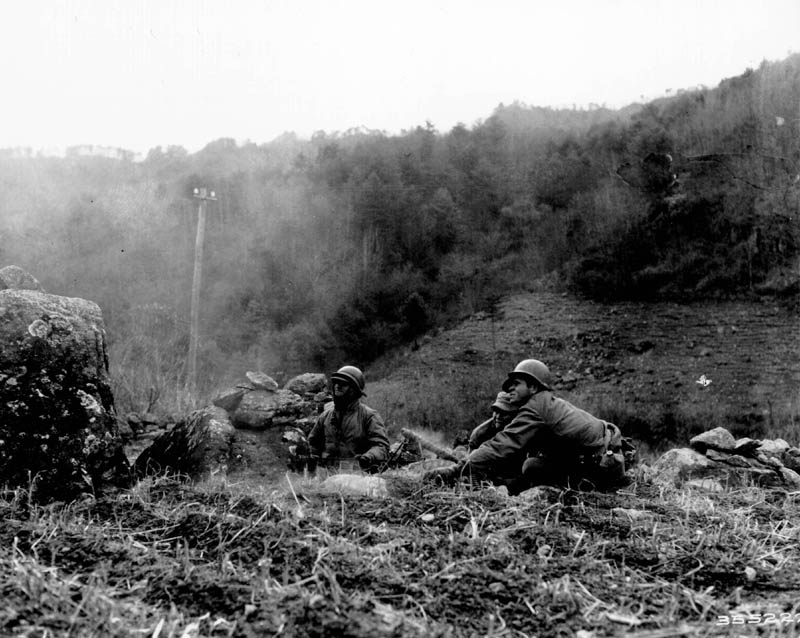
Company C on patrol

On 27 August 1950, the 65th Infantry, with 3,920 officers and men organized into three infantry battalions, one artillery battalion and a tank company departed from Puerto Rico and arrived in Pusan, South Korea on 23 September 1950. It was during the long sea voyage that the men nicknamed the 65th Infantry as the "Borinqueneers". "That was the name of the more peaceful of the two original Indian tribes that inhabited the island of Puerto Rico "Borinquen", and many of the men were direct descendants of that industrious race of people."

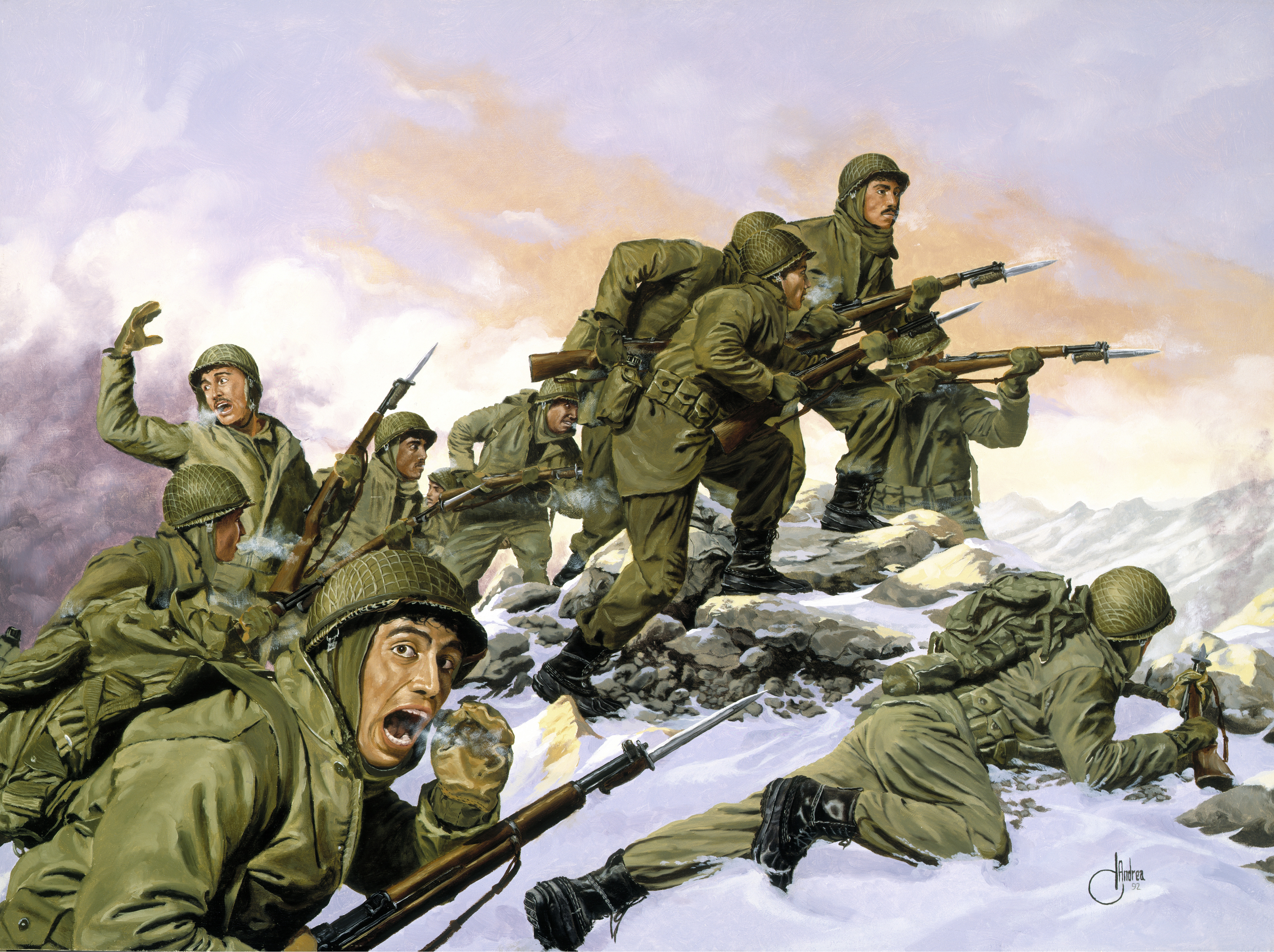
A 1992 painting depicting the 65th Infantry's bayonet charge against a Chinese division during the Korean War.

The men of the 65th, now attached to the Army's 3rd Infantry Division, were among the first infantrymen to meet the enemy on the battlefields of Korea. After November 1950, they fought daily against units of the Chinese People's Liberation Army after the Chinese entered the war on the North Korean side. The 296th Regiment took its place at Puerto Rico. In Korea, the regiment covered the retreat of the 1st Marine Division during the Battle of Chosin Reservoir.

One of the hardships suffered by the Puerto Ricans was the lack of warm clothing during the cold, harsh winters. "Born in a semitropical climate- most of them had never seen snow- they had lived and fought through it all without complaint."

External videos
- Newsreel of the 65th Infantry Regiment in Korea.

The enemy made many attempts to encircle the regiment, but each time they failed because of the many casualties inflicted by the 65th. Because the 65th held their positions, that enabled the U.S. Marines to withdraw from the Chosin Reservoir in December 1950. When the Marines were surrounded by the Chinese Communist troops close to the Manchurian border, they were ordered to retreat and work their way back to Hungnam. The men of the 65th rushed to their defense and were ordered to stay behind and fight the enemy. As a result, the Marines were able to withdraw to their ships with the 65th holding the rearguard. The 65th, attached to the 1st Marine Division, was awarded the Navy Unit Commendation for their defense and were among the last units to embark from Hungnam. Among the battles and operations in which the 65th participated was Operation Killer in January 1951, becoming the first regiment to cross the Han River in South Korea during the operation.

In April 1951, the regiment participated in the Uijonbu Corridor drives and in June 1951, the 65th was the third regiment to cross the Han Ton River. The 65th took and held Chorwon and they were also instrumental in breaking the Iron Triangle of Hill 717 in July 1951. In November 1951, the regiment fought off an attack by two regimental size enemy units. Colonel Juan César Cordero Dávila of the 296th Regiment requested a transfer to active service in Korea. In December 1951, Chief of Staff J. Lawton Collins visited Puerto Rico and granted the request, reassigning him to the 65th, replacing him with Lt. Col. Sepúlveda. Col. Cordero was formally named commander of the 65th Infantry on 8 February 1952, thus becoming one of the highest ranking ethnic officers in the Army. Brigadier William Warner Harris (USMA 1930) published a book that captured the distinguished history of the 65th while under his command. When asked if the Puerto Ricans would fight when the time came, then Colonel William Warner Harris' answer was just as direct: "My Puerto Ricans will fight anyone, anywhere."

=== Battles of Outpost Kelly and Jackson Heights ===
On 3 July 1952, the regiment defended the main line of resistance (MLR) for 47 days and saw action at Cognac, King and Queen with successful attacks on Chinese positions. In September 1952, the 65th Infantry defended a hill known as Outpost Kelly. Chinese Communist forces overran the hill in what became known as the Battle of Outpost Kelly. On two occasions, the 65th Regiment was overwhelmed by Chinese artillery and driven off.

2nd Platoon, Company C in 1952

In October 1952, the regiment also saw action in the Chorwon Sector and on Iron Horse, Hill 391, whose lower part was called "Jackson Heights" in honor of Capt. George Jackson (see: Col. Carlos Betances Ramírez). Company G of the 65th fought a desperate battle to hold on to Hill 391. After enduring days of artillery bombardment with limited artillery support of their own, Company G withdrew to avoid being overrun by a numerically superior foe.

In June 1953, the 2nd Battalion conducted a series of successful raids about two and a half miles southeast of Jackson Heights and in November the regiment successfully counter-attacked enemy units in the Numsong Valley and held their positions until the armistice was reached.

Many non-Puerto Rican Hispanics served in the 65th Infantry during the war. Among those who distinguished themselves in combat and who served in the conflict as a member of the 65th Infantry was a young first lieutenant of Mexican American descent whose name is Richard Edward Cavazos. Cavazos entered the military in Texas and served as company commander of Company E of the 2d Battalion. Cavazos, who in 1982 became the first Hispanic to become a four-star general in the United States Army, was the recipient of the Distinguished Service Cross, the Silver Star Medal, and the Bronze Star Medal.

=== Mass court martial ===
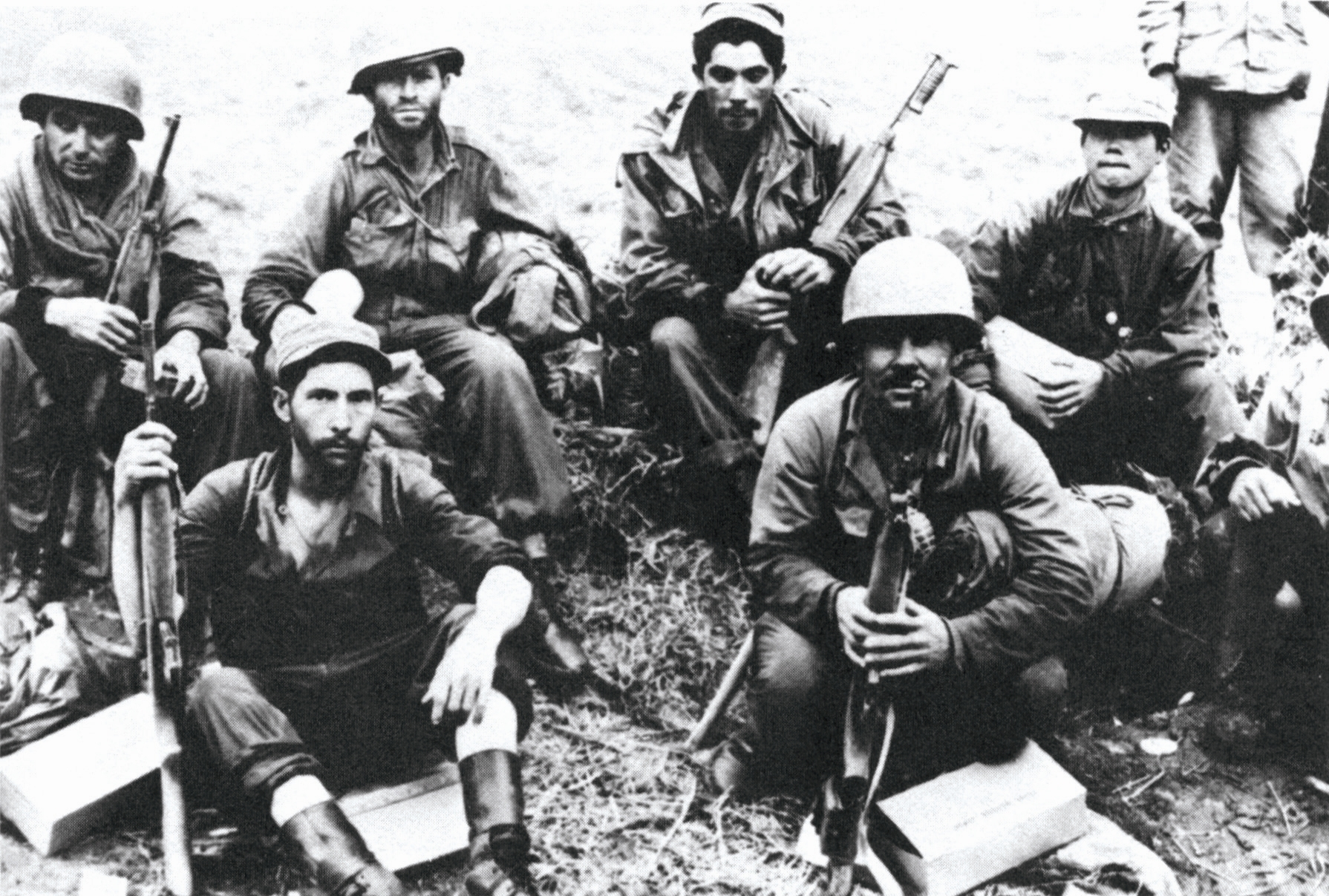
Soldiers of the 65th, North of the Han River, Korea, June 1951.

Col. Cordero Dávila was relieved of his command by Col. Chester B. DeGavre, a West Point graduate and a "Continental", an officer from the mainland United States, and the officer staff of the 65th was replaced with non-Hispanic white officers. DeGavre, upset over the fact that "G" company did not hold on to Hill 391, ordered that the unit stop calling itself the "Borinqueneers", cut their special rations of rice and beans, ordered the men to shave off their mustaches, and had one of them wear a sign that read: "I am a coward." The language barrier, an NCO shortage, and poor leadership were factors that influenced some of the men of Company L in their refusal to continue to fight.

One hundred and sixty-two Puerto Ricans of the 65th Infantry were arrested. Between 23 November – 26 December 1952, ninety-five soldiers were tried by General Court-Martial in fifteen separate trials. Ninety-one were found guilty and sentenced to prison terms ranging from one to 18 years of hard labor. It was the largest mass court-martial of the Korean War. According to cultural historian Silvia Álvarez Curbelo, the government of Puerto Rico, caught in the middle of a potentially damaging affair that could jeopardize its political agenda, kept silent for nearly two months. Finally, the incidents were made known by a local newspaper alerted by letters written by the imprisoned soldiers to their families. Secret negotiations between the U.S. and Puerto Rican governments took place and the Secretary of the Army Robert T. Stevens moved quickly to remit the sentences and grant clemency and pardons to all those involved.

The breakdown of the 65th resulted from a number of factors: a shortage of officers and non-commissioned officers, a rotation policy that removed combat-experienced leaders and soldiers, tactical doctrine that led to high casualties, a shortage of artillery ammunition, communication problems between largely white, English-speaking officers and Spanish-speaking Puerto Rican enlisted men, and declining morale. The report also found bias in the prosecution of the Puerto Ricans, citing instances of Continental soldiers who were not charged after refusing to fight in similar circumstances, before and after Jackson Heights. Though the men who were court martialed were pardoned, a campaign for a formal exoneration was launched.

=== Awards in the Korean War ===
Master Sergeant Juan E. Negrón was awarded the Distinguished Service Cross for his courageous actions while serving as a member of Company L, 65th Infantry Regiment, 3d Infantry Division during combat operations against an armed enemy in Kalma-Eri, Korea 28 April 1951. His award was upgraded to the Medal of Honor on 18 March 2014.

Negrón's Medal of Honor citation

MASTER SERGEANT JUAN E NEGRON

For service as set forth in the following citation: The Medal of Honor is posthumously presented to Juan E. Negrón (RA10406243), Master Sergeant, U.S. Army, for extraordinary heroism in connection with military operations against an armed enemy of the United Nations while serving with the 65th Infantry Regiment, 3d Infantry Division. Master Sergeant Negrón distinguished himself by extraordinary heroism in action against enemy aggressor forces in the vicinity of Kalma-Eri, Korea, on 28 April 1951. On that date, Sergeant Negrón took up the most vulnerable position on his company's exposed right flank after an enemy force had overrun a section of the line. When notified that elements of the company were withdrawing, Sergeant Negrón refused to leave his exposed position, but delivered withering fire at hostile troops who had broken through a road block. When the hostile troops approached his position, Sergeant Negrón accurately hurled hand grenades at short range, halting their attack. Sergeant Negrón held the position throughout the night, while an allied counter attack was organized and launched. After the enemy had been repulsed, fifteen enemy dead were found only a few feet from Sergeant Negrón's position. The extraordinary heroism exhibited by Sergeant Negrón on this occasion reflects great credit on himself and is in keeping with the finest traditions of the military service.

A total of 61,000 Puerto Ricans served in the military during the Korean War. And around 90% of the Puerto Ricans that saw action in Korea were volunteers. The 65th Infantry was awarded battle participation credits for the following nine campaigns: UN Defense-1950, UN Offense-1950, CCF Intervention-1950, First UN Counterattack Offensive-1951, UN and CCF Spring Offensive-1951, UN Summer-Fall Offensive-1951, 2nd Korean Winter 1951–52, Korean Summer-Fall-1952 and 3rd Korean Winter-1952-53. They are credited with the last battalion-sized bayonet charge in U.S. Army history.

Individual awards in the Korean War
Award	Name	Total
	Medal of Honor	1
	Distinguished Service Cross	10 (Note: Sergeant Negrón's Distinguished Service Cross was upgraded to the Medal of Honor on 18 March 2014)
	Silver Star	256
	Bronze Star	606
	Purple Heart	2,771 (Note: In accordance to the "TAGOKOR Korean War Casualty File" and the "American Battle Commission", of the 2,771 Purple Hearts awarded 670 were "KIA" (Killed in action) and 2,101 were non-casualties. The non-casualties included those who were awarded more than one Purple Heart and those who were "MIA's" (Missing in action).)

Ten Distinguished Service Crosses, 256 Silver Stars and 606 Bronze Stars for valor were awarded to the men of the 65th Infantry. Of the ten Distinguished Service Crosses that were awarded to the members of the 65th Infantry, five were awarded to Puerto Ricans:

- Sergeant First Class Modesto Cartagena
- Private Badel Hernández Guzmán
- Master Sergeant Juan E. Negrón (upgraded to the Medal of Honor)
- Corporal Fabián Nieves Laguer
- Master Sergeant Belisario Noriega

According to El Nuevo Día newspaper, 30 May 2004, a total of 756 Puerto Ricans were killed in Korea, from all four branches of the U.S. armed forces. However, according to "All POW-MIA Korean War Casualties", the total number of Puerto Rican casualties in the Korean War was 732. However this total may vary slightly since some non-Puerto Ricans such as Captain James W. Conner were mistakenly included. Out of the 700 plus casualties suffered in the war a total of 121 men were listed as missing in action. The Battle of Outpost Kelly accounted for 73 of the men missing in action from the total of 121. Out of the 73 MIAs suffered by the regiment in September 1952, 50 of them occurred on the same day, 18 September. For a list of names of those who were declared MIA, see: List of Puerto Ricans missing in action in the Korean War. According to the TAGOKOR Korean War Casualty File and the American Battle Commission site the members of the 65th who fought in Korea were awarded a total of 2,771 Purple Heart Medals. On 12 February 1951, General Douglas MacArthur, wrote in Tokyo: "The Puerto Ricans forming the ranks of the gallant 65th Infantry give daily proof on the battlefields of Korea of their courage, determination and resolute will to victory, their invincible loyalty to the United States and their fervent devotion to those immutable principles of human relations which the Americans of the Continent and of Puerto Rico have in common. They are writing a brilliant record of heroism in battle and I am indeed proud to have them under my command. I wish that we could count on many more like them."

=== Post Korean War ===
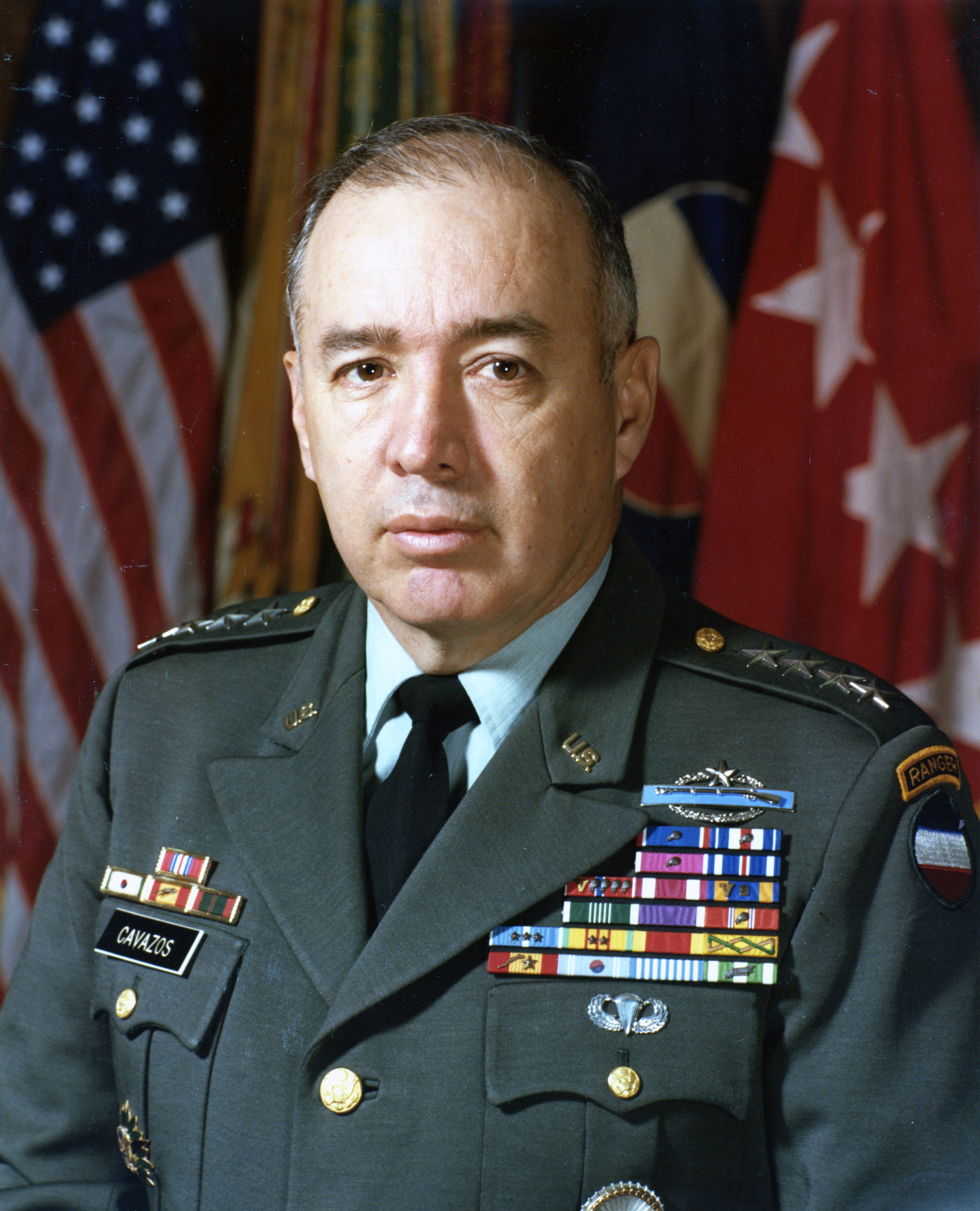
General Richard E. Cavazos, the first Mexican American to reach the rank of brigadier general in the U.S. Army

The 65th Infantry was relieved from assignment to the 3d Infantry Division on 3 November 1954, and, returning to Puerto Rico, it was assigned on 2 December 1954, to the 23rd Infantry Division, which encompassed geographically separated units in the Caribbean region. On 10 April 1956, it was inactivated at Losey Field, Puerto Rico, and relieved from assignment to the 23d, which itself was inactivated.

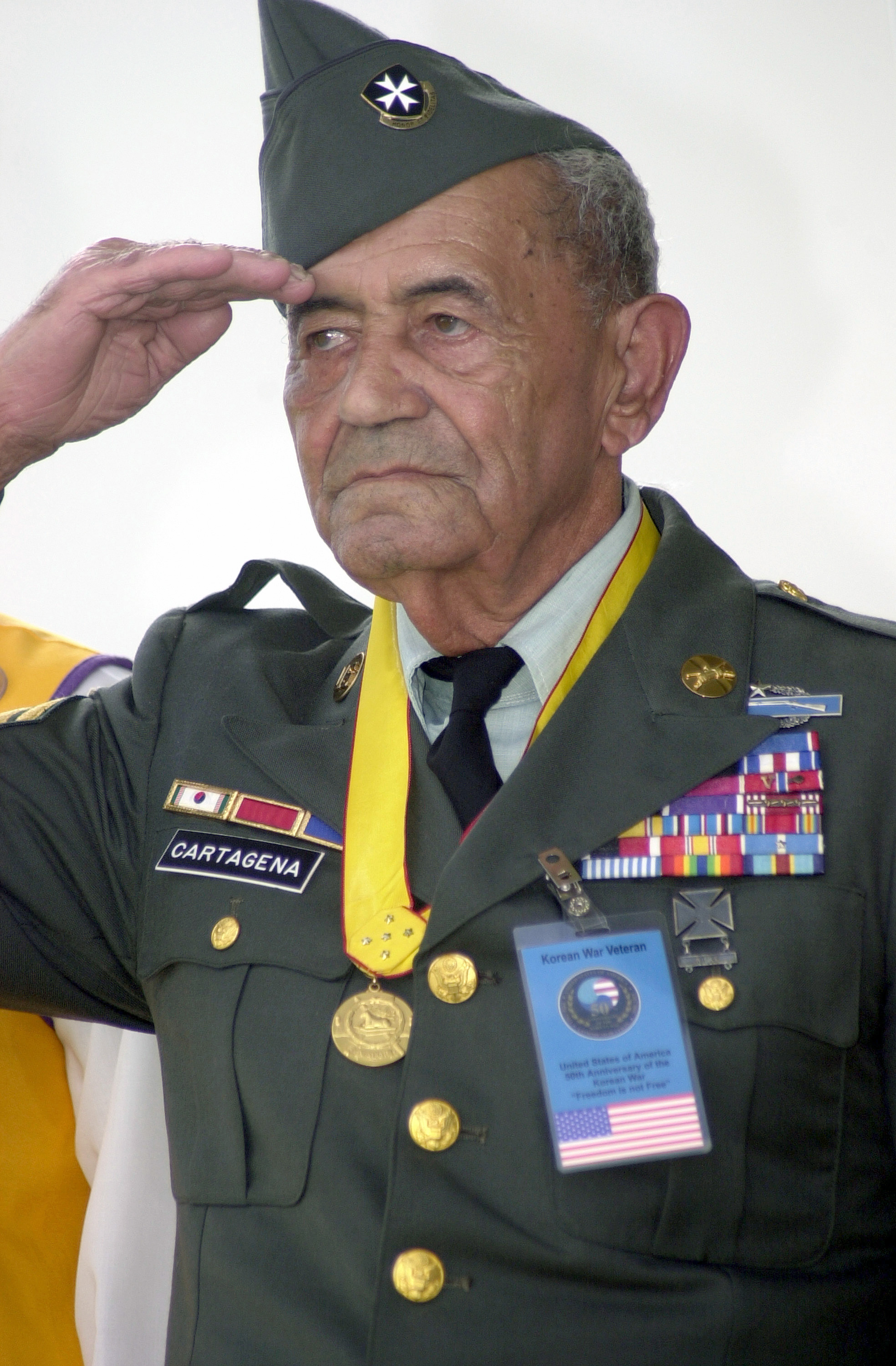
Sergeant Modesto Cartagena, the most decorated Hispanic U.S. soldier in the Korean War

On 6 February 1959, the regiment was deactivated from the Regular Army but the Puerto Rican Army National Guard soon adopted "65" as the identifying number for their existing 296th Regimental Combat Team at Losey Field, mainly composed of reserve component personnel.

On 15 February 1959, it was organized to consist of the 1st Battle Group, 65th Infantry, an element of the 92nd Infantry Brigade. On 21 February 1960, commemorated as National Guard Day, the 65th Infantry Regiment was formally transferred from the Regular Army to the PRNG, in an activity where Gen. Cesár Cordero handed the units colors to Col. Rafael Rodríguez. That same year, Company B of the 65th Regiment created Employer's Day (Día del Patrono in Spanish) where the employers of the volunteers that serve in the PRNG are instructed about the job that their employees do with the entity and participate in training of their own. The idea behind the initiative was facilitating the processing of the request of leave-of-absence to train for two weeks during the summer. On 1 May 1964, it was reorganized to consist of the 1st Battalion, 65th Infantry, and remained assigned to the 92nd. It was reorganized again on 1 April 1971, to consist of the 1st Battalion and the separate Company E. This was followed by another reorganization on 1 September 1978, to consist of the 1st and 2nd Battalions within the 92nd, as well as the separate Company E. Less than two years later another reorganization on 29 February 1980, eliminated the separate Company E while retaining the 1st and 2nd Battalions.

On 27 October 1987, the regiment was withdrawn from CARS and reorganized under the United States Army Regimental System with headquarters at Cayey. It was reorganized on 1 September 1992, to consist of the 1st Battalion, 65th Infantry, and remained assigned to the 92nd Infantry Brigade.

On 14 February 2003, it was ordered into active federal service at home stations and released on 12 February 2005, reverting to territorial control. On 1 October, of that year it was reorganized as the 65th Infantry Regiment in which only the 1st Battalion was active.

The separate Company E was a Ranger unit given federal recognition effective 1 April 1971, and had a total authorized strength of 198 personnel. It was added to the PR ARNG on that date while the 755th Transportation Company (Medium Truck, Cargo) was deleted. Co E (Ranger), 65th Infantry relocated from Vega Baja to San Juan on 2 February 1976, and was inactivated as federal recognition was withdrawn effective 29 February 1980. This resulted in the allocation of an ARNG ranger company being transferred from the PR ARNG to the Texas ARNG, in which Company G (Ranger), 143rd Infantry was activated in Houston from elements of the 2d Battalion (Airborne), 143rd Infantry, 36th Airborne Brigade, which was being inactivated effective 1 April 1980.

== Twenty-first century ==
The 65th Infantry Regiment's 1st Battalion, along with its sister battalion, the 1–296th Infantry, was transferred to the 92nd Infantry Brigade, PRARNG (now the 92nd Maneuver Enhancement Brigade). After the September 11 terrorist attacks, the battalion has served in both in the Iraq War as well as guard duties at Guantanamo Bay and in Djibouti.

In 2009, Company C, 1st Battalion, 65th Infantry Regiment was deployed to the Horn of Africa and stationed at Camp Lemonnier in Djibouti, after completing a 14-month deployment at Guantanamo Bay, Cuba. Company C carried the crew-served weapons to protect the camp. It also operated the entry control checkpoints, protected U.S. and allied ships at the massive Djibouti Port, and guarded the U.S. Embassy there. By mid-2009, the rest of the battalion deployed there in case a larger combat maneuver element was needed to operate from the base. The Somali border is less than 10 miles from Camp Lemonnier.

== Legacy ==
A monument dedicated to the 65th Infantry Regiment in Río Piedras, Puerto Rico

During the Korean War, the Borinqueneers were awarded 10 Distinguished Service Crosses (Juan Negrons was upgraded to the Medal of Honor), 256 Silver Stars, 606 Bronze Stars, and 2,771 Purple Hearts.

Puerto Rico honored the unit by naming one of its principal avenues "Avenida 65 de Infantería" in San Juan. The names of those killed in combat are inscribed in "El Monumento de la Recordación" (Monument of Remembrance), which was unveiled on 19 May 1996 and is situated in front of the Capitol Building in San Juan, Puerto Rico.

In November 1999, Governor Pedro Rosselló, along with the Senate of Puerto Rico, chartered the 65th Infantry Honor Task Force and appointed Anthony Mele as chairman to work with Major General Nels Running, director, Committee of the 50th Anniversary of the Korean War to commemorate the 65th Infantry Regiment. The 65th Infantry Honor Task Force is a coalition of individuals, veterans organizations, and groups dedicated to advocate and preserve the legacy of the 65th Infantry Regiment. The group organized tree planting and plaque commemoration ceremonies around the US, to include Arlington National Cemetery in Virginia; Fort San Felipe del Morro in San Juan, Puerto Rico; and Fort Logan National Cemetery in Denver.

On 20 May 2001, the government of Puerto Rico unveiled a monument honoring the 65th Infantry Regiment. The monument was made by artist Sonny Rodríguez, and is called "Mission Accomplished". It contains a statue of a soldier wearing a poncho with his rifle in one hand and the regiment's flag in the other hand.

On 7 June 2007, PBS aired The Borinqueneers, a documentary about the 65th Infantry written and directed by Noemí Figueroa Soulet with Raquel Ortiz as co-director. The narrators were Héctor Elizondo (English) and David Ortiz-Anglero (Spanish).

On 30 November 2012, an entire stretch of Southern Boulevard in the South Bronx, New York was co-named La 65 de Infantería Boulevard.

On 1 October 2013, the 65th Infantry Honor Task Force organized veterans from the 65th and their families to attend a salute to the regiment by the 3rd U.S. Infantry "The Old Guard" at Fort Myer, Virginia, a tour of the Tomb of the Unknown Soldiers, and wreath laying ceremony at the Korean War Veterans Memorial in Washington, D.C.

22–23 March 2014, the 65th Infantry Honor Task Force organized the salute of the first Medal of Honor awarded to a Borinqueneer; MSG Juan E. Negron in New York with Iris Negron, daughter of MSG Negron, and BG Jose Burgos. In attendance were New York State Senators William E. Larkin, a Korean War combat veteran, and David Carlucci who presented a proclamation from the New York State Senate.

In 2014 the National Puerto Rican Day Parade, which is attended by nearly two million people and broadcast live on Fox TV, was dedicated to the Borinqueneers.

On 25 May 2018, the city of the city of Springfield, Massachusetts unveiled "65th Infantry Way".

On 13 December 2019, US President Donald Trump signed into law the H.R.2325 legislation to designate the facility of the United States Postal Service located at 100 Calle Alondra in Río Piedras, Puerto Rico, as the "65th Infantry Regiment Post Office Building".

On 27 January 2020, an entry gate to Fort Buchanan in Puerto Rico was officially renamed the Borinqueneers Gate in honor the 65th Infantry Regiment.

In early 2021, a law was signed to make 13 April National Day of Borinqueneers so that veterans could commemorate the service of Borinqueneers. 13 April was chosen because it was the day when members of the unit received a Congressional Gold Medal in 2016.

There is a monument to the Borinqueneers in Korea.

=== 65th Infantry Regiment Association ===
The 65th Infantry Regiment Association, led by Victor Labarca, works with all matters related to the 65th Infantry Regiment and its service members.

== Congressional Gold Medal ==
A Congressional Gold Medal is an award bestowed by the United States Congress and is, along with the Presidential Medal of Freedom, the highest civilian award in the United States. It is awarded to persons "who have performed an achievement that has an impact on American history and culture that is likely to be recognized as a major achievement in the recipient's field long after the achievement."

While a civilian award, generally recognizing single individuals (politicians, scientists, actors, military leaders, civilian heroes and others) or small groups (people who took a stand for civil rights and others), Congressional Gold Medals have also been awarded to a few military units, such as the Native American code talkers, and the Japanese American 100th Infantry Battalion and 442nd Infantry Regiment, the Tuskegee Airmen, and others.

In 2013, S. 1726, a bill to confer the Congressional Gold Medal on the 65th Infantry Regiment, was introduced in Congress. It was signed by President Barack Obama at a ceremony on 10 June 2014, becoming Public Law 113–120. A decision on the design for the medal was awarded in 2015, after the Citizens Coinage Advisory Committee agreed on a choice from submitted designs on 16 June 2015. The 65th Infantry Borinqueneers Congressional Gold Medal has, for the obverse, a design depicting a close-up portrait of a unit staff sergeant, with three soldiers traversing rocky ground in the background. The reverse features an historic sentry box in Old San Juan, Puerto Rico, an olive branch, the 65th Infantry insignia patch and unit's motto, HONOR ET FIDELITAS (Honor and Fidelity) and a short list showing "1899–1956" "World War I" "World War II" "Korean War".

On 13 April 2016, leaders of the United States House and Senate officially awarded the Congressional Gold Medal to the 65th Infantry Regiment. Beginning in 2021, National Borinqueneers Day is celebrated on 13 April.

== Notable Puerto Rican members ==
Amongst the notable Puerto Ricans who served in the "65th Infantry Regiment" and/or its predecessor the "Porto Rico Provisional Regiment of Infantry":

Name	Image	Notability
Major General Juan César Cordero Dávila		His active military career began on 1 June 1942, when he was summoned to serve in World War II. He served with the regiment in World War II for over three and a half years. He was named commanding officer of the 65th Infantry Regiment during the Korean War thus, rising to become one of the highest-ranking ethnic officers in the United States Army.
Brigadier General Antonio Rodríguez Balinas		First commander of the Office of the First U.S. Army Deputy Command (awarded two Silver Stars).
Colonel Virgil R. Miller		Miller was commissioned a second lieutenant in the infantry in 1924 upon graduation from the United States Military Academy. In 1926, he returned to Puerto Rico, where he served with the 65th Infantry at Camp Las Casas. In 1940, he transferred to the 24th Infantry Division in Hawaii. During World War II he commanded the 442nd Regimental Combat Team and led the rescue of the "Lost Battalion".
Colonel Carlos Betances Ramirez		Betances served as battalion commander from July to October 1952. He was the only Puerto Rican officer to command an infantry battalion in the Korean War. From November 1952 to September 1953, Betances served as the operations and training officer and military advisor to General Min Ki Sik, who commanded the 21st Infantry Division, Army of the Republic of Korea, and was instrumental in organizing and training four infantry divisions for the Republic of Korea
Colonel Antulio Segarra		Segarra served as military aide to the military governor of Puerto Rico Theodore Roosevelt, Jr. and during World War II commanded the 65th Infantry Regiment. He was the first Puerto Rican Regular Army officer to command a Regular Army regiment.
Lieutenant Colonel Teófilo Marxuach		Marxuach served in the Porto Rico Provisional Regiment of Infantry, which was renamed the 65th Infantry Regiment. He fired what is considered to be the first shot of World War I by the regular armed forces of the United States against any ship flying the colors of the Central Powers.
Second Lieutenant Pedro Albizu Campos		Served in the Army Reserves from 1914 to 1918. In 1917, he was assigned to the 375th of the Porto Rico Provisional Regiment of Infantry. The segregated unit was made up of Afro-Puerto Ricans. The war ended before the unit could be deployed. He later presided over the Puerto Rican Nationalist Party.
Master Sergeant Juan E. Negrón		On 18 March 2014, was posthumously awarded the Medal of Honor for his courageous actions while serving as a member of Company L, 65th Infantry Regiment, 3d Infantry Division during combat operations against an armed enemy in Kalma-Eri, Korea on 28 April 1951.
Master Sergeant Pedro Rodriguez		Awarded two Silver Stars in one week. On 24 March 1951, Sgt. Rodríguez led a squad with fixed bayonets on an assault on the area from which the gunfire came from. The enemy fled leaving their supplies behind. He was awarded his first Silver Star Medal. A week later on 31 March, the enemy pinned down and inflicted heavy casualties on a leading platoon. Sgt. Rodríguez was ordered to assist the stalled unit and led his platoon in an assault that routed the enemy. Sgt. Rodríguez was awarded a second Silver Star Medal.
Sergeant First Class Agustín Ramos Calero		Calero's company was in the vicinity of Colmar, France and engaged in combat against a squad of German soldiers in what is known as the Battle of Colmar Pocket. Calero attacked the squad, killing ten of them and capturing 21 shortly before being wounded himself. Following these events, he was nicknamed "One-Man Army" by his comrades. He was awarded 22 decorations and medals from the U.S. Army for his actions during World War II making him one of the most decorated (22 decorations) soldiers in the United States during World War II.
Sergeant First Class Modesto Cartagena		Cartagena was the most decorated Puerto Rican soldier in history. Some of the military decorations which he was awarded are the following: Distinguished Service Cross; Silver Star; Legion of Merit; Bronze Star with an "V" Device and an oak leaf cluster which identifies one (or both) award(s) as resulting from an act of combat heroism; Purple Heart and the Military Medal of Honor of the Legislative Assembly of Puerto Rico.

== Unit citations ==
The 65th Infantry has been awarded the following citations:

– Navy Unit Commendation
– National Defense Service Medal
– World War I Victory Medal
– American Defense Service Medal
– American Campaign Medal
– European-African-Middle Eastern Campaign Medal
– World War II Victory Medal
– Army of Occupation Medal
– Presidential Unit Citation (two awards)
– Meritorious Unit Commendation (two awards)
– Republic of Korea Presidential Unit Citation (two awards)
– Chryssoun Aristion Andrias (Bravery Gold Medal of Greece)

Ribbons

- Republic of Korea Presidential Unit Citation (ROK)
- Presidential Unit Citation (USA)

== See also ==
- Camp Las Casas
- Borinqueneers Congressional Gold Medal
- Henry Barracks, Puerto Rico
- List of Puerto Rican military personnel

Other military articles related to Puerto Rico:

- Military history of Puerto Rico
- El Grito de Lares
- Intentona de Yauco
- Puerto Rican Campaign
- Puerto Ricans in World War I
- Puerto Ricans in World War II
- Puerto Ricans in the Vietnam War
- Puerto Rican women in the military
- Puerto Rico National Guard
