= Battle of Outpost Kelly =

1952 battle of the Korean War

Coordinates: 38.14°N 126.944°E

- Part of the Korean War
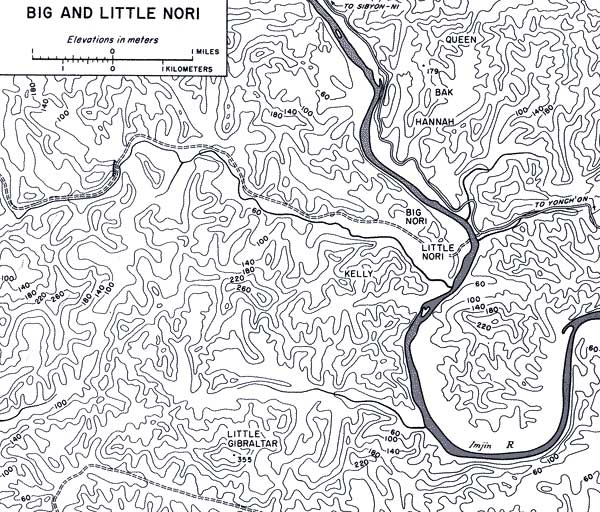
- Map showing location of Outpost Kelly
Date	17–24 September 1952
Location	Northwest of Cheorwon, Korea
Result	Chinese victory

Belligerents
United Nations: United States	China

Commanders and leaders
(United States) Col. Juan César Cordero Dávila	Unknown

Units involved
(United States) 65th Infantry Regiment	348th Regiment, 116th Division

Casualties and losses
350 casualties	Unknown

The Battle of Outpost Kelly was fought between 17 and 24 September 1952 during the Korean War between United Nations Command (UN) and Chinese forces for possession of a UN outpost position. The Chinese successfully seized the position and defended it against UN counterattacks. The battle is notable for the defending UN force having been largely composed of Spanish-speaking Puerto Ricans.

== Background ==
In September 1952 the US 3rd Infantry Division defended a sector of the Jamestown Line the UN main line of resistance in Korea, occupying a series of outposts manned by forces varying from a squad to a company in strength on the low-lying hills in front of the line. One of these was Outpost Kelly, situated 3 miles (4.8 km) south of Kyeho-dong and about 1 mile (1.6 km) west of the double horseshoe bend of the Imjin River. On 17 September C Company, under the operational control of the 2d Battalion, 65th Infantry Regiment, defended Kelly. Facing the 65th Regiment in the area around Kelly were the Chinese People's Volunteer Army (PVA) 2nd and 3rd Battalions, 348th Regiment, 116th Division, 39th Army. There had been an increase in the number and aggressiveness of PVA patrols in the entire 65th Regiment sector during September and also an increase in the frequency of PVA mortar fire. These signs usually heralded an impending attack.

== Battle ==
On the night of 17 September an estimated company from the PVA 2nd Battalion, 348th Regiment, probed Outpost Kelly's defenses. When C Company requested reinforcements to fight off this probe, Col. Juan César Cordero Dávila, commanding officer of the 65th Regiment, ordered B Company to relieve its sister company on Kelly. B Company took over Kelly and passed to the operational control of the 2nd Battalion commander, Lt. Col. Carlos Betances Ramirez, early in the morning of 18 September. The PVA mortar fire on Kelly continued throughout the day and 1st Lt. William F. Nelson, B Company commander, in the early evening requested that the artillery supporting his position be prepared to fire variable time fuze shells in the event of a PVA attack. Less than an hour after his request an estimated two companies from the 2nd Battalion, 348th Regiment, attacked the outpost from the southwest, northwest and northeast. The northeast attack evidently surprised Lieutenant Nelson and his men, for the PVA swept across the hill and took the B Company machine gun position on the northwest corner of the hill from the rear. Killing the gunner, the PVA advanced along the trenches and closed in hand-to-hand combat. The sergeant in charge of the machine gun position managed to escape after he sustained arm injuries in the fight. Communications between Kelly and battalion headquarters were cut off and the situation was very confused by midnight, but reports of PVA herding American prisoners down the slopes of Kelly indicated that the position had been lost. There were also reports that some of the PVA were wearing US uniforms, but it was not clear whether they had donned these clothes before or after the attack.

To find out whether the PVA intended to occupy the outpost, the regimental intelligence officer ordered the 2nd Battalion to send a platoon as quickly as possible from E Company to reconnoiter the hill. The patrol cleared the Jamestown Line shortly before daylight on the 19th, but soon ran into machine gun and rifle grenade fire as it advanced up the hill. Convinced that the PVA planned to remain, Colonel Cordero made an assessment of the situation. The heavy mortar fire and the attack that had followed had badly depleted B Company, although there might be some remnants of the company still on the hill. He assumed that the PVA now held the position with small arms, light machine guns and light mortars. There was a waist-deep, circular trench that ringed the military crest of the hill completely and four bunkers. At the base of the hill, on the approaches, the PVA had established combat outposts of squad size. Colonel Betances, the 2nd Battalion commander, ordered two platoons from E Company to advance on Kelly on the morning of 20 September. By late afternoon one platoon had fought its way to the top. The second was still on the porters' trail moving forward slowly. The PVA, however, had no intention of surrendering possession of Kelly for they quickly sent reinforcements to bolster their defending forces. The platoon on the hill began to take casualties from the small arms, machine gun and mortar fire, and the second platoon was forced to fall back as it encountered similar PVA opposition on its way to the crest. Faced with the PVA determination to hang on to the outpost and the mounting casualty list, the two platoons withdrew to the Jamestown Line. In the meantime, the 1st Battalion prepared to counterattack through the 2nd Battalion's positions. During the evening of 20 September, A Company, under 1st Lt. St. Clair Streett, Jr., moved forward to take up the attack from the south and C Company advanced to the base of the hill on which Kelly was located. The PVA mortar and artillery became very heavy as the men crossed the valley floor en route to the hill approaches. As the two companies began their ascent, B Company moved forward toward the outpost line to support the attack. Mortar fire came in swiftly and with deadly effect as casualties cut the strength of B Company to twenty-six men and forced the cancellation of the company mission. The PVA fire was also taking its toll of A and C Companies. In addition, the PVA used time-fuzed artillery fire as the 1st Battalion troops edged their way to the top. The airbursts over the heads of A and C Company were demoralizing and caused panic. Lieutenant Streett had to fall back and reorganize A Company, while C Company clung to a finger of the hill with two platoons. A and C Companies totaled about 60 men each at this juncture, while the PVA had an estimated 100 men on the hill and was reinforcing freely. A UN artillery barrage pounded the PVA positions on Kelly early in the morning of 21 September. But when the remnants of A and C Companies tried to close in on the PVA positions, they were met with small arms fire and hand grenades. Two squads from C Company almost reached the crest of Kelly shortly before noon only to receive mortar concentrations that forced them to fall back to the trenches. No sooner had the PVA mortar fire ceased when the Chinese counterattacked and forced C Company to pull out completely. In the early afternoon A, B and C Companies were ordered to return to their company areas. They had suffered over seventy casualties in the fight for Kelly. That night the 1st Battalion relieved the 3rd Battalion and the action around Kelly slowed down for several days.

As the 3rd Battalion took over responsibility for the 1st Battalion positions, Lt. Col. Lloyd E. Wills, who had assumed command of the 3rd Battalion on 20 September, and his staff, drew up an attack plan to recapture Kelly. Since the previous efforts by forces ranging from one to four platoons had failed to dislodge the PVA, Colonel Wills received approval to use his three rifle companies. K Company would attack from the east and L Company would come in from the west, while I Company would be the reserve. At 05:20 on 24 September the 105 mm howitzers of the 58th Field Artillery Battalion opened up on the PVA positions on and around Kelly for thirty minutes. Meanwhile, a platoon of tanks from the 64th Tank Battalion moved into position to support the 3rd Battalion attack. Artillery and tanks sent 25,000 rounds against the PVA in support of the attack. K and L Companies were in their attack positions by 05:40 and launched their assault half an hour later. As K Company troops approached Kelly, the PVA opened up with intense small arms, machine gun, artillery and mortar fire and soon had K Company pinned down. The heavy PVA concentration of firepower and the growing list of casualties led to panic and confusion in the company. With control of the company disintegrating and the casualties mounting, the K Company commander asked for permission to pull back and reorganize. Colonel Cordero at 07:00 ordered that this request be denied and that the company continue its attack. Shortly thereafter contact with K Company was lost. The artillery forward observer managed to hold together ten men from the company, however, and Colonel Wills, the battalion commander, instructed him to continue the attack on Kelly with his small force. On the western slopes of Kelly, L Company assaulted the PVA positions at 06:35. Despite heavy mortar fire, one squad reached the top at 07:20 and quickly asked for tank fire. Clinging to the trenches on the south slope of Kelly, the L Company squad was unable to move forward against stubborn PVA resistance. PVA artillery and mortar fire continued to be very heavy. Since contact with K Company had not been regained by 08:00 hours, Colonel Cordero ordered I Company to move to the rear of Hill 105, 800 yards (730 m) east of Kelly, and to prepare to take over K Company's zone. I Company moved toward Hill 105, but the PVA artillery zeroed in on the company and scored several direct hits. The men began to scatter and drift back to the Jamestown Line. Colonel Wills sent his S-3, to help reorganize the company, since contact with I Company's commander had been lost after the PVA artillery concentrations had begun. Colonel Wills left at 09:00 to take over the reorganization of both I and K Company stragglers as they returned to the Jamestown Line without weapons or equipment. With only the remnants of L Company still on Kelly, and the other two companies depleted and demoralized, the situation appeared grim. The two squads from L Company hung on to one of the trenches on the south slope and at 09:20 Colonel Cordero ordered them to stay there at all costs. When Colonel Wills finally regained contact with I Company at 10:00, it had reorganized and had two platoons intact; the remainder of the company's whereabouts was unknown. Colonel Wills telephoned the assistant division commander, Brig. Gen. Charles L. Dasher, Jr., and informed him that the battalion had approximately two platoons available for combat. General Dasher told Wills to cease to attack and to continue the reorganization of the battalion, which had suffered 141 casualties in the action. By early afternoon the squads from L Company had been withdrawn and the stragglers reassembled. But the division commander, Maj. Gen. Robert L. Dulaney, decided that the battalion and the regiment should not resume the battle for Kelly. The 3rd Battalion went into reserve positions on the night of 24 September and the 65th Regiment confined itself to routine patrolling until the Republic of Korea Army 1st Infantry Division relieved the 3rd Division on 30 September.

== Aftermath ==
During the action between 17 and 24 September for Kelly and the surrounding outposts, the 65th Regiment suffered casualties of approximately 350 men, or almost 10 percent of its actual strength. Yet the casualties alone do not serve to explain the weaknesses that arose when the regiment went on the offense. Colonel Cordero in his command report for the month attributed the poor performance of his combat units to the rotation program. During the nine-month period from January—September 1952, Colonel Cordero stated, the regiment had rotated almost 8,700 men, including close to 1,500 noncommissioned officers. Only 435 non-commissioned officers had been received to replace the losses, and company commanders had been forced to assign inexperienced privates first class and privates to key positions in many rifle platoons. Out of an authorized strength of 811 noncommissioned officers in the upper three grades, the 65th Regiment had only 381 and many of the latter had been developed from recent replacements. The lack of experienced platoon sergeants and corporals had affected the combat efficiency of the regiment, Colonel Cordero went on, despite the high esprit de corps shown by the many Puerto Rican members of the regiment. In many cases, as soon as the company and platoon leaders became casualties, the inexperience and lack of depth at the combat company level became readily apparent. There was a failure to sustain the momentum of the attack and a tendency to become confused and disorganized after the leaders became casualties. Colonel Cordero recommended that his regiment be provided with a monthly quota of 400 replacements including a fair proportion of the upper three grades so that he could remedy this basic weakness.

Although Colonel Cordero did not mention the language barrier, it should not be overlooked that the great majority of enlisted men in the regiment spoke only Spanish, creating communication problems between the English-speaking officers and the enlisted men from Puerto Rico.
