= Borinqueneers Congressional Gold Medal =

Congressional Gold Medal awarded to Puerto Rico's 65th Infantry Regiment

The "Borinqueneers Congressional Gold Medal" is a Congressional Gold Medal awarded to Puerto Rico's 65th Infantry Regiment by President Barack Obama, at an official ceremony on June 10, 2014. On May 19, 2014, the United States House of Representatives passed the Bill, known as HR 1726 and three days later on May 22, 2014, the Senate approved Bill S. 1174. With the approval of both houses, the president signed the legislation which awarded the Congressional Gold Medal to the 65th Infantry, the first segregated Hispanic military unit, and the first unit of the Korean War, to receive such distinction.

== 65th Infantry Regiment ==
The 65th Infantry Regiment, nicknamed "The Borinqueneers" from the original Taíno name of the island (Borinquen), was a segregated Puerto Rican regiment of the United States Army. The 65th Infantry Regiment participated in World War I, World War II and the Korean War.

== Congressional Gold Medal ==
External audio
- Radio interview about the Borinqueneer CGM movement

A Congressional Gold Medal is an award bestowed by the United States Congress and is, along with the Presidential Medal of Freedom, the highest civilian award in the United States. It is awarded to persons "who have performed an achievement that has an impact on American history and culture that is likely to be recognized as a major achievement in the recipient's field long after the achievement."

As of 2013, four military units had been awarded the Congressional Gold Medal. These were the Navaho Wind Talkers – Native American Marines whose primary job was the transmission of secret tactical messages with the use of their Native language; the Nisei Soldiers - Japanese American intelligence soldiers during WWII in the Pacific, Africa, Italy and France; the Tuskegee Airmen - the first African-American military aviators; and the Montford Point Marines - the first African-Americans to break the race barrier in the Marines. In addition, the Women's Air Service Pilots (WASP) received the Congressional Gold Medal.

== Congressional Gold Medal initiative ==
The bill that would confer the Congressional Gold Medal on the 65th Infantry Regiment was introduced in both the United States House of Representatives and in the United States Senate. In order for the bill to become law and the medal to be conferred, one of those bills would have to pass in both chambers and be signed by the President of the United States. H.R. 1726 was introduced into the House of Representatives on April 25, 2013, by Representative Bill Posey of Florida and Pedro Pierluisi, Puerto Rico's Resident Commissioner to the U.S. Congress. S. 1174 was introduced into the Senate on June 18, 2013, by Senator Richard Blumenthal of Connecticut. The two bills, H.R. 1726 and S. 1174, were formally recognized as "identical bills" by the Congressional Research Service. This meant that they were "word-for-word identical."

Section two of the bill reads as follows:

The Speaker of the House of Representatives and the President pro tempore of the Senate shall make appropriate arrangements for the award, on behalf of the Congress, of a single gold medal of appropriate design in honor of the 65th Infantry Regiment, known as the Borinqueneers, in recognition of its pioneering military service, devotion to duty, and many acts of valor in the face of adversity.

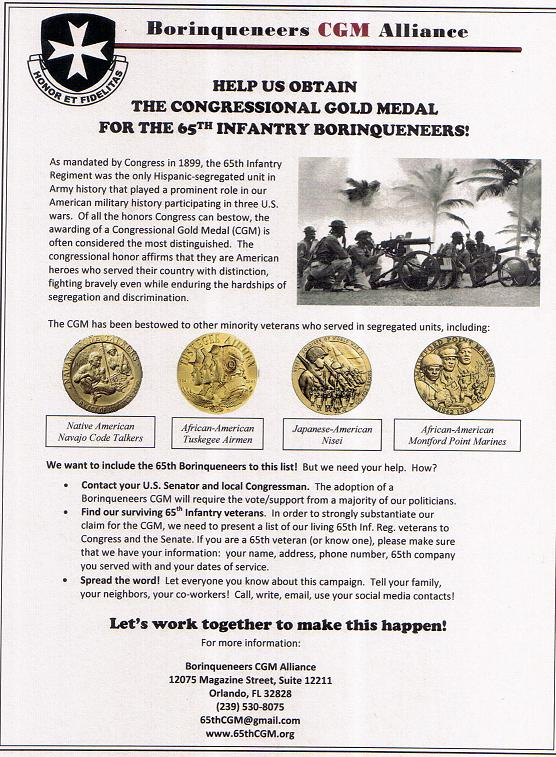
Borienquneers CGM Alliance, which promoted the Congressional Gold Medal for the 65th Infantry

Advocates garnered over 25 regional proclamations and resolutions signed by governors, mayors, county commissioners and state senators/representatives throughout the U.S., all urging the U.S. Congress to award the Congressional Gold Medal to the 65th Infantry. There are also 10 memorials and monuments honoring the 65th Infantry around the nation.

On 14 August 2013, the Vietnam Veterans of America, a congressional-chartered veterans service organization, issued a national resolution in favor of the Congressional Gold Medal for the 65th Infantry Regiment. Also in August 2013, the Hispanic American Veterans of Connecticut announced their support of the CGM initiative.

Other national organizations supporting the Congressional Gold Medal initiative include the League of United Latin American Citizens (LULAC), Military Order of the Purple Heart (MOPH), American GI Forum (AGIF), and National Puerto Rican Coalition (NPRC). Individuals and organizations around the U.S. are currently advocated for the passage of both 65th Infantry CGM bills. They are urged their federal elected officials to join on as co-sponsors of HR 1726 in the House, and S 1174 in the Senate. The Borinqueneers Congressional Gold Medal Alliance, officially sponsored by the You Are Strong! Center on Veterans Health and Human Services, was the leading organization dedicated to the effort.

== Congressional Gold Medal legislation ==
The Bill, known as HR 1726, passed favorably in the House on May 19, 2014. Three days later on May 22, 2014, the Senate approved Bill S. 1174. The Borinqueneers CGM Bill went to President Barack Obama, who signed the legislation, since then known as Public Law 113-120, at an official ceremony on June 10, 2014. The 65th Infantry is the first Hispanic military unit, and the first unit of the Korean War, to be awarded the Congressional Gold Medal.

== Congressional Gold Medal design ==
A decision on designs for a congressional gold medal being awarded in 2015 to the Borinqueneers of the 65th Infantry Regiment was selected by the Citizens Coinage Advisory Committee on June 16, 2015. For the 65th Infantry Borinqueneers congressional gold medal, the CCAC recommended for the obverse a design depicting a close-up portrait of a unit staff sergeant, with three soldiers traversing rocky ground in the background. The recommended reverse features an historic sentry box in Old San Juan, Puerto Rico, an olive branch, the 65th Infantry insignia patch and unit's motto, HONOR ET FIDELITAS (Honor and Fidelity). However, the gold medal design process and candidate design did not achieve unanimous support among various members of the Borinqueneers community. Some Borinqueneers advocates were not satisfied with the lack of fairness, inclusion, and transparency of the medal design process itself. In August 2015, the Borinqueneers CGM design was finally approved by the Secretary of the Treasury. On April 13, 2016, leaders of the United States House and Senate awarded the Congressional Gold Medal to the 65th Infantry Regiment.

== See also ==
- Military history of Puerto Rico
- Camp Las Casas - the main training base of the "Porto Rico Regiment of Infantry" which would later become the 65th Infantry Regiment
- Puerto Ricans in World War I
- Puerto Ricans in World War II
