= Carmen Lozano Dumler =

First Puerto Rican women to become a United States Army officer

Carmen Maria Lozano Dumler
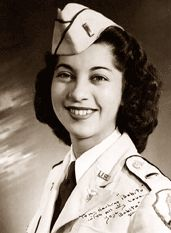
- Second Lieutenant Carmen Maria Lozano Dumler
- Born: September 18, 1921; San Juan, Puerto Rico
- Died: March 29, 2015 (aged 93); Hoffman Estates, Illinois
- Burial place: Abraham Lincoln National Cemetery in Elwood, Illinois
- Military career
- Allegiance: United States Women's Army Corps
- Service years: 1944–1946
- Rank: Second Lieutenant
- Units: 65th Infantry Regiment, United States Army Nurse Corps

Second Lieutenant Carmen Maria Lozano Dumler, (Note: This name uses Spanish marriage naming customs; the first is the maiden family name "Lozano" and the second or matrimonial family name is "Dumler".) RN, (September 18, 1921 – March 29, 2015), was one of the first Puerto Rican women to become a United States Army officer. During World War II, she served as a nurse and interpreter, and provided support for patients who spoke Spanish. Lozano Dumler has since been featured in promotional and recruitment materials that celebrate diversity in the US military.

== Early years ==
Lozano was born and raised in San Juan, the capital city of Puerto Rico. She lived in a coffee plantation which was managed by her father. She received her primary and secondary education in San Juan. She graduated from the Presbyterian Hospital School of Nursing in the spring of 1944.

By this time the United States had entered World War II, and the Army drafted many Puerto Rican troops for service in the Caribbean and South Atlantic Theater of Operations. The Army recognized the need for Puerto Rican nurses to address language barriers in hospitals, and the Surgeon General's Office, the Governor of Puerto Rico, the Commissioner of Health of Puerto Rico and physicians worked together to develop criteria to select Puerto Rican nurses for the Army Nurse Corps for the first time. In 1944, Women's Army Corps (WAC) recruiters were sent to Puerto Rico to organize a unit of 200 WACs, and over 1,500 women applied. Lozano applied to become an Army nurse and on Aug. 21, 1944, became one of thirteen women selected. According to the U.S. Department of Veterans Affairs, she "described it as the happiest day of her life."

== Military service ==
Lozano was one of the first Puerto Rican women to become a United States Army officer. According to retired Lt. Col. Marilla Cushman of the Women in Military Service for America Memorial Foundation, "She is certainly a pioneer for Puerto Rican women, one of the first 13 to be commissioned into the United States Army Nurse Corps (USANC). Carmen and her 12 cohorts led the way for Puerto Rican women in the Army Nurse Corps.

On August 21, 1944, she was sworn in as a 2nd Lieutenant and assigned to the Rodriguez (161st) General Hospital (named after Major Fernando E. Rodriguez Vargas) at Fort Brooke, Puerto Rico in San Juan, where she continued to receive further training. Upon completing her advanced training, she was sent to Camp Tortugero where she also assisted as an interpreter whenever needed. According to the U.S. Department of Veterans Affairs, in addition to her work as a translator, she also provided "her support to the patients who appreciated having someone to talk to who shared the same language."

In 1945, Lozano was reassigned to the 359th Station Hospital of Ft. Read, Trinidad and Tobago, British West Indies, where she attended wounded soldiers who had returned from Normandy, France. According to Judith Bellafaire of the Women in Military Service for America Memorial Foundation, "Many appreciated being able to "talk out" their anxieties and nightmares," and according to the U.S. Army Medical Department Office of Medical History, "The Puerto Rican Army Nurses were applauded for their bilingual language abilities. Spanish-speaking patients expressed great appreciation for the nurses from their homeland that could speak and write letters for them in their native language."

While in Trinidad, she decided that she would like to become a doctor after the war and took correspondence courses from Louisiana State University. She met Lieutenant Joseph Dumler in Trinidad and they were married in the Base Chapel.

== Later years ==
After the war, Dumler moved to Baltimore, Maryland with her husband. She hoped to continue her education in medicine and enrolled as a part-time student at the University of Maryland, but put her studies on hold after having her first child. Over eighteen years, she gave birth to seven children. She later continued college at Roosevelt University, and completed a degree in Psychology at Northeastern University, as well as a Certificate Diploma in Substance Abuse Counseling. She continued her nursing and counseling career at the Brothers Health System for 20 years until her retirement in 1985. After retiring, the Dumlers lived in Florida for 23 years, and rented out four properties they bought as investments.

Dumler died March 29, 2015, at Brookdale Senior Living facility in Hoffman Estates, Illinois. She was 93 and had Alzheimer's disease.

In 2020 Carmen Lozano Dumler was posthumously inducted to the Puerto Rico Veterans Hall of Fame.

== Awards and decorations ==
Among Dumler's awards and decorations are:

	Army Commendation Medal	
Army Good Conduct Medal	Women's Army Corps Service Medal	American Campaign Medal
World War II Victory Medal	Army of Occupation Medal	Humanitarian Service Medal

Badges:

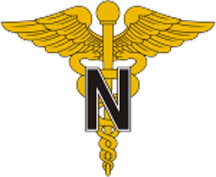
- Army Nurse Corps badge

== Honors ==
Lozano Dumler has been featured in material that celebrates diversity in the US military, for Hispanic Heritage Month and for recruitment material:

- National Hispanic Heritage Month 2009 (U.S. Army Medical Department)
- National Hispanic Heritage Month 2015 (Defense Equal Opportunity Management Institute)
- National Hispanic Heritage Month 2019 (U.S. Department of Veterans Affairs)

== See also ==
- Carmen Contreras-Bozak
- Carmen García Rosado
- List of Puerto Ricans
- List of Puerto Rican military personnel
- Puerto Rican women in the military
- Puerto Ricans in World War II
- History of women in Puerto Rico
