= Carmen García Rosado =

Puerto Rican educator, author and activist

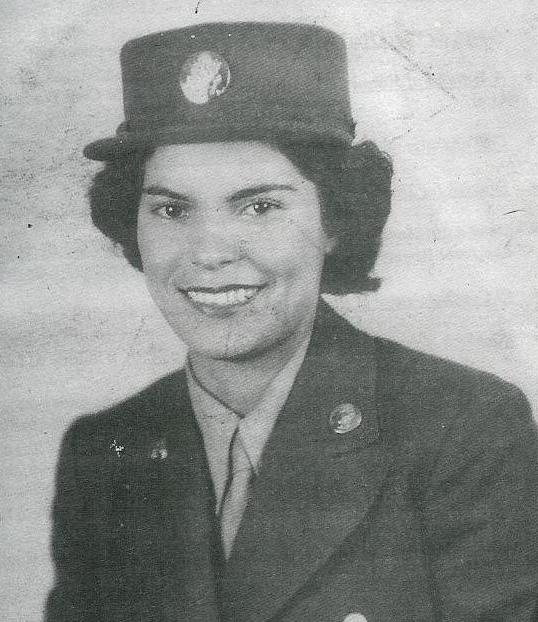
- PFC Carmen García Rosado; Among the first 200 Puerto Rican women to serve in the U.S. Women's Army Corps
- Born: October 28, 1924; Humacao, Puerto Rico
- Died: April 30, 2016 (aged 91)
- Burial place: Borinquen Memorial Cemetery in Caguas, Puerto Rico
- Military career
- Allegiance: United States Women's Army Auxiliary Corps
- Service years: 1944–1946
- Rank: Private First Class
- Units: Company 6, 2nd Battalion, 21st Regiment
- Other work: Author of "LAS WACS-Participacion de la Mujer Boricua en la Segunda Guerra Mundial" (The WACs-The participation of the Puerto Rican women in the Second World War). Consultant to the Director of Veterans Affairs in Puerto Rico.

PFC Carmen García Rosado (born October 29, 1926 - April 30, 2016) was an educator, author and activist for the rights of women veterans who was among the first 200 Puerto Rican women to be recruited into the WAC's during World War II. Her book "LAS WACS-Participacion de la Mujer Boricua en la Segunda Guerra Mundial" (The WACs-The participation of the Puerto Rican women in the Second World War), is the first book to document the experiences of the first 200 Puerto Rican women who participated in said conflict as members of the armed forces of the United States.

== Early years ==
García Rosado was the seventh of nine siblings born in Humacao, Puerto Rico to Jesus García Doble and Maria Rosado Arce de García. Her father was the foremen of a sugar plantation who would often be assigned to work in Cuba and the Dominican Republic, thus inspiring the desire within García Rosado to travel and see the world beyond Puerto Rico. She received her primary and secondary education in the towns of Las Piedras and Caguas. She continued her education in Santurce and graduated from Central High School. In 1944, at the age of 18, she earned her teachers diploma from the University of Puerto Rico and worked in her profession in the mountainous areas between the towns of Las Piedras and Humacao. On September 17, 1944, "El Mundo", a local newspaper, announced that the United States were seeking women volunteers for the Women's Army Auxiliary Corps (WAC's).

== World War II ==
By this time the United States had entered World War II and therefore needed to boost its military capabilities; as a result, the Army ordered Puerto Rico's 65th Infantry Regiment to full war strength and drafted many Puerto Ricans — even those whose knowledge of English was minimal. As a result, the Army recognized the need for bilingual personnel to fill in the clerical positions left empty by the male soldiers who were sent to the front lines. In 1944, the Army sent three WAC (Women's Army Corps) recruiters to the island to organize a unit of 200 WACs. Over 1,500 women responded to the call and applied, however only 200 were selected, among them, against her parents wishes, was García Rosado.

After being sworn in during the ceremonies held in San Juan, García Rosado and the other 199 women were sent to Fort Oglethorpe, Georgia for their basic training. The women were tested for their abilities and were given further training. Their duties varied, some were assigned as dental assistants, others as clerks and so on. García Rosado was assigned to the position of dental assistant. The women were assigned to Company 6, 2nd Battalion, 21st Regiment of the Women's Army Auxiliary Corps, a segregated Hispanic unit, and upon the completion of their training were sent to the port of embarkation of New York City. According to García Rosado, one of the hardships which the women were subject to was the social and racial discrimination against the Latino community which at the time was rampant in the United States.

== Post World War II ==
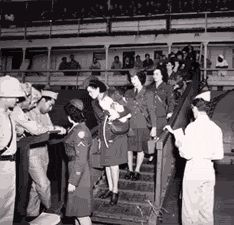
Puerto Rican WAC's upon their return to Puerto Rico

The American participation in the Second World War came to an end in Europe on May 8, 1945 when the western Allies celebrated "V-E Day" (Victory in Europe Day) upon Germany's surrender, and in the Asian theater on August 14, 1945 "V-J Day" (Victory over Japan Day) when the Japanese surrendered by signing the Japanese Instrument of Surrender. The women of Company 6, 2nd Battalion, 21st Regiment of the Women's Army Auxiliary Corps returned to Puerto Rico on January 6, 1946, where Garcia Rosado and the others were Honorably Discharged from the military. After the war, Garcia Rosado, like so many other women in the military, returned to civilian life.

From 1946 to 1948, García Rosado continued in her profession as a teacher, during which time she earned her Bachelor of Arts degree from the Interamerican University, then known as the Polytechnic Institute at San German, Puerto Rico. She traveled through various states of the U.S. to work on her thesis, titled "Career Education," and worked on her doctorate in supervision and administration in education.

== Later years ==
García Rosado retired in 1979, but continued to work at Ana G. Mendez's Puerto Rico Institute Jr. College and later as the Resident Director of the "Señoritas de la Universidad del Sagrado Corazon" (University of the Sacred Heart). In 1989, she was named consultant to the Director of Veterans Affairs in Puerto Rico. In her position she became an activist and worked for the rights of the Puerto Rican women veterans. Among the things that she sought and her accomplishments, while in her position, were the following:

1. That the rights earned and back up by law number 13,1980, also known as the Letter of rights of the Puerto Rican Veteran, be respected.
2. That a register of all the Puerto Rican women veterans be made and that an Association of United Puerto Rican Female Veterans be organized.
3. That the veterans receive a funeral with full military honors and that they be permitted to be interred in whichever cemetery their families choose.
4. That a monument dedicated to the Puerto Rican women veterans be erected.
5. García Rosado was named president of the Association of United Puerto Rican Female Veterans.
6. In 2018, García Rosado was posthumously inducted into the Puerto Rico Veterans Hall of Fame.

== Written works ==
In 2006, García Rosado published her book titled "LAS WACS-Participacion de la Mujer Boricua en la Segunda Guerra Mundial" (The WACs-The participation of Puerto Rican women in World WarII), the first book to document the experiences of the first 200 Puerto Rican women who participated in said conflict as members of the armed forces of the United States.

== Honors and recognitions ==
1. Tribute from the "Female Mentorship Training"
2. Named "Distinguished Veteran of the Year" (2006)
3. Resolution from the Puerto Rican Senate, in name of all the female veterans of Puerto Rico.
4. Named "grand marshal" in the Veterans Day parade of Puerto Rico.

== Awards and decorations ==
Among García Rosado's awards and decorations are:

	Army Good Conduct Medal	
Women's Army Corps Service Medal	American Campaign Medal	World War II Victory Medal

== See also ==
- Carmen Contreras-Bozak
- Carmen Lozano Dumler
- List of Puerto Ricans
- List of Puerto Rican military personnel
- Puerto Rican women in the military
- Puerto Ricans in World War II
- Military history of Puerto Rico
- List of Puerto Rican writers
- History of women in Puerto Rico
