= Carmen Contreras Bozak =

Puerto Rican soldier

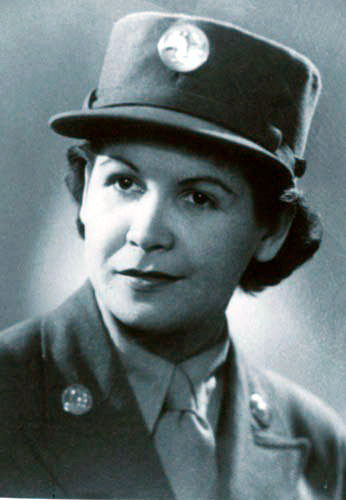
- Tech4 Carmen Contreras Bozak; First Hispanic to serve in the U.S. Women's Army Corps
- Born: Carmen Contreras Torres; December 31, 1919; Cayey, Puerto Rico
- Died: January 30, 2017 (aged 97); Land o' Lakes, Florida
- Burial place: Arlington National Cemetery
- Military career
- Allegiance: Women's Army Corps
- Service years: 1941–1945
- Rank: Technician Fourth Grade
- Unit: 149th WAAC Post Headquarters Company
- Conflicts: World War II
- Awards: European-African-Middle Eastern Campaign Medal with 2 Battle Stars
- Other work: Founder – chapter of WAC Veterans; Founder – chapter of the Society of Military Widows

Tech4 Carmen Contreras Bozak (Note: This name uses Spanish marriage naming customs; the first is the maiden family name "Contreras" and the second or matrimonial family name is "Bozak".) (December 31, 1919 – January 30, 2017) was the first Puerto Rican woman to serve in the U.S. Women's Army Corps (WAC) where she served as an interpreter and in numerous administrative positions.

== Early years ==
Carmen Contreras Bozak (birth name: Carmen Contreras Torres) (Note: In this Spanish name, the first or paternal surname is Contreras and the second or maternal family name is Torres.) was the oldest of three siblings born and raised in the town of Cayey, Puerto Rico, located in the central mountains of the island. In Cayey, she received her primary education.

Her parents divorced and her mother, Lila Baudilia Lugo Torres, moved the family to New York City. In New York, Bozak attended Julia Richman High School and after she graduated, she went to work for the National Youth Administration. Bozak worked for the War Department in Washington, D.C. as a payroll clerk after taking and passing a Civil Service test.

== World War II ==
The Women's Army Auxiliary Corps (WAAC) was established during World War II on May 15, 1942, "for the purpose of making available to the national defense the knowledge, skill, and special training of the women of the nation." During this period, the Army was looking for bilingual Hispanic women to fill assignments in fields such as cryptology, communications and interpretation. In 1942, Bozak joined the Women's Army Auxiliary Corps (WAAC) and was sent to Fort Lee, Virginia, for training. Bozak volunteered to be part of the 149th WAAC Post Headquarters Company the first to go overseas, setting sail from New York Harbor for Europe in January 1943. She was the first person of Hispanic heritage and the first of approximately 200 Puerto Rican women who would serve in the Women's Army Corps during World War II.

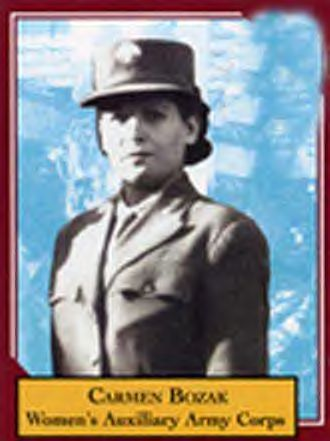

The unit arrived in Northern Africa on January 27, 1943, and rendered overseas duties in Algiers, in General Dwight D. Eisenhower’s theatre headquarters. The women who served abroad were not treated like the regular Army servicemen. They did not receive overseas payment nor could they receive government life insurance. These women had no protection if they became ill, wounded or captured. If captured, the women were considered as "auxiliaries" serving with the Army rather than in it, and did not have the same protections under international law as the male soldiers. These were factors which the Army took into consideration when they decided to integrate the Women's Corps into the regular Army. On July 3, 1943, the WAC bill, which established the Women's Army Corps as integral part of the Army of the United States, was signed into law (Public Law 78-110) becoming effective on September 1, 1943.

Bozak was promoted to the rank of Tech 4 (Technical Sergeant) which, in today's Army, would equal the rank of Sergeant (E-4). Her responsibilities included the transmission of encoded messages between Eisenhower's headquarters in Algiers and the battlefield in Tunisia. After returning home, she entered Valley Forge General Hospital in July 1945, for treatment of an eye infection which she had contracted in Algiers. There she met Theodore John Bozak, a recovering combat wounded patient, who would become her husband. Carmen Contreras Bozak and her husband had three children, two sons, Brian and Robert, and a daughter, Carmen.

== Later years ==
Bozak Lived for many years in Fort Lauderdale, Florida. There she volunteered at the Oakland Park VA for many years, and as a real estate broker. She started a chapter of WAC Veterans and in 1998 founded a chapter of the Society of Military Widows. She moved to Tampa where she resided until her death in January 2017 at the age of 97. Bozak was buried in the Arlington National Cemetery, next to her husband Theodore John Bozak.

In 2019, she was posthumously inducted into the Puerto Rico Veterans Hall of Fame.

== Awards and decorations ==
Among her military decorations were the following:

Army Good Conduct Medal		Women's Army Corps Service Medal
American Campaign Medal	European-African-Middle Eastern Campaign Medal with two bronze service stars	World War II Victory Medal

== See also ==
- Carmen Lozano Dumler
- Carmen García Rosado
- List of Puerto Ricans
- List of Puerto Rican military personnel
- Puerto Rican women in the military
- Puerto Ricans in World War II
- History of women in Puerto Rico
