= List of Puerto Rican military personnel =

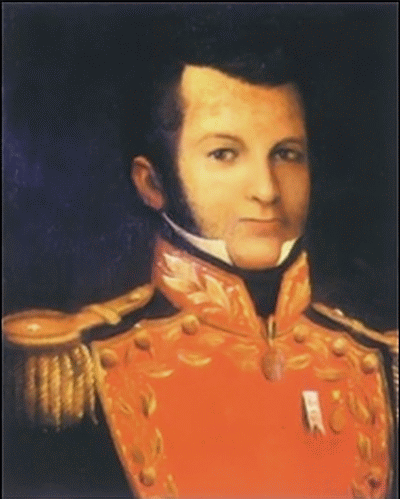
Antonio Valero de Bernabé

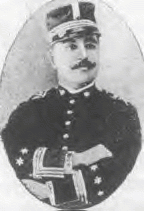
Ángel Rivero Méndez

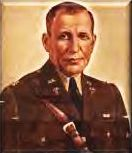
Fernando E. Rodríguez Vargas

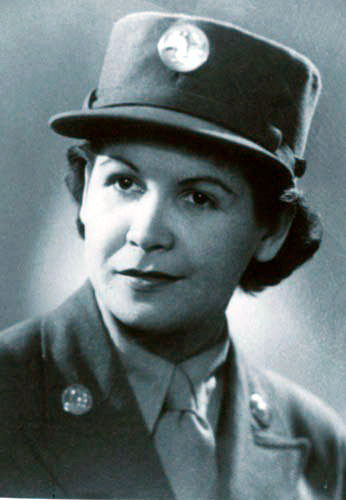
Carmen Contreras-Bozak

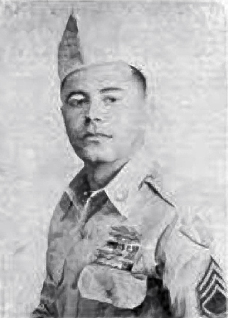
Modesto Cartagena

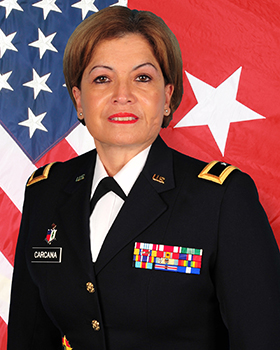
Marta Carcana

Throughout history Puerto Ricans, including people of Puerto Rican descent, have gained notability as members of the military. They have served and have fought for many countries, such as Canada, Cuba, England, Mexico, Spain, the United States and Venezuela.

Puerto Ricans have fought and defended their homeland against attacks from the Caribs and pirates. They fought against the invasions of foreign countries and defeated the British, French, and Dutch in doing so. They fought alongside General Bernardo de Gálvez during the American Revolutionary War in the battles of Baton Rouge, Mobile, Pensacola and St. Louis. and in Europe against the forces of Napoleon Bonaparte at the Siege of Saragossa.

Puerto Ricans such as Augusto Rodríguez, who resided in the United States in the mid-19th century, fought in the American Civil War. They also fought against the Spanish Empire. They fought for Mexico's independence and in the Latin American wars of independence alongside Simón Bolívar. In Puerto Rico they revolted against Spanish rule and fought for Puerto Rico's independence in the Grito de Lares and in the Intentona de Yauco. They also fought for Cuba's independence in the Ten Years' War alongside General Máximo Gómez and as members of the Cuban Liberation Army alongside José Martí. At the end of the 19th century, Puerto Ricans fought alongside their Spanish counterparts in the Spanish–American War against the United States in the Battle of San Juan Hill; in Cuba as members of the 1st, 2nd and 3rd Puerto Rican Provisional Battalions; and in Puerto Rico when the American military forces invaded the island, in what is known as the Puerto Rican Campaign. They also fought against the "Tagalos" during the Philippine Revolution.

Puerto Rico became a territory of the United States upon the signing of the Treaty of Paris on December 10, 1898. Upon the outbreak of World War I, the U.S. Congress approved the Jones–Shafroth Act, which gave Puerto Ricans American citizenship with certain limitations. For example, they were, and still are, not permitted to vote for the President of the United States, who is also the Commander-in-Chief of the armed forces, while residing on the island. However, with American citizenship, many Puerto Ricans, with the exception of women, became eligible for the military draft.

== World War I ==
In World War I Puerto Ricans opened fire, in what is considered to be the first shot of that war on behalf of the United States, on an armed German supply ship trying to force its way out of San Juan Bay. As members of the "Porto Rico Regiment" they were sent to Panama to guard and defend the Panama Canal Zone. In New York, many Puerto Ricans of African descent joined the 396th Infantry Regiment which was mostly composed of African Americans. As members of the 396th Infantry Regiment, also known as the "Harlem Hellfighters," they were not allowed to fight alongside their white counterparts; however, they were permitted to fight as members of a French unit in French uniforms and were awarded the French Croix de Guerre. Before the United States entered World War II, Puerto Ricans were already fighting on European soil, not only in the Rif War, but also on both sides of the Spanish Civil War.

== World War II ==
During World War II, Puerto Ricans served in every military branch of the United States. Puerto Ricans from the island served in the 65th Infantry Regiment, also known as the Borinqueneers, which participated in combat in the European Theater—in Germany and Central Europe. Those who resided in the mainland of the United States were assigned to regular units of the military and served either in the European or Pacific theaters of the war.

Puerto Rican officers trained the Tuskegee Airmen, the first African American military aviators at the Tuskegee Army Air Field in Alabama. These men formed the famed 99th Fighter Squadron.

World War II was the first conflict in which Puerto Rican women were allowed to serve in the U.S. Armed Forces. Over 1,000 applications were received and 200 women served in the Puerto Rican WAC unit, Company 6, 2nd Battalion, 21st Regiment of the Women's Army Auxiliary Corps, a segregated Hispanic unit. Some were assigned to nursing, dental or clerical duties, however some women were assigned to units which were stationed in the European Theater of operations. Puerto Ricans played important roles as commanders in the Armed Forces of the United States for the first time. Some Puerto Rican aviators served and fought for three different countries as members of the Royal Canadian Air Force, the British Royal Air Force and the United States Army Air Forces.

== Korean War and other conflicts ==
During the Korean War four Puerto Ricans were awarded the Medal of Honor. They also distinguished themselves as part of the 65th Infantry Regiment receiving many awards and recognitions, including ten Distinguished Service Crosses, however some men were unjustly accused and involved in the largest court martial of said war. On April 13, 2016, leaders of the United States House and Senate awarded the Congressional Gold Medal to the 65th Infantry Regiment. Puerto Ricans have continued to fight in every conflict in which the United States has been involved, among which are the Vietnam War in which five Puerto Ricans were awarded the Medal of Honor, Operation El Dorado Canyon, Operation Desert Shield, Operation Restore Hope, Operation Desert Storm and in the military campaigns of Afghanistan and Iraq, in what the United States and its allies refer to as the war on terror.

Some Puerto Ricans became notable commanders. Some have been awarded the Medal of Honor, the highest military decoration in the United States; or the Cruz Laureada de San Fernando (Laureate Cross of Saint Ferdinand), the highest military decoration awarded by the Spanish government. In World War II, the Korean War and the Vietnam War Puerto Ricans were the most decorated Hispanic soldiers and in some cases, such as Operation Restore Hope and Operation Desert Shield, they were the first to die in combat. The following list has been divided by the century in which the person became notable and the surnames are placed in alphabetical order.

== 16th century ==
- Agüeybaná II, Cacique of "Borikén" (Puerto Rico). Agüeybaná II led the Taínos in the fight against Juan Ponce de León and the conquistadores in what is known as the "Taíno Rebellion of 1511."

== 17th century, Puerto Rico as a Spanish Province ==
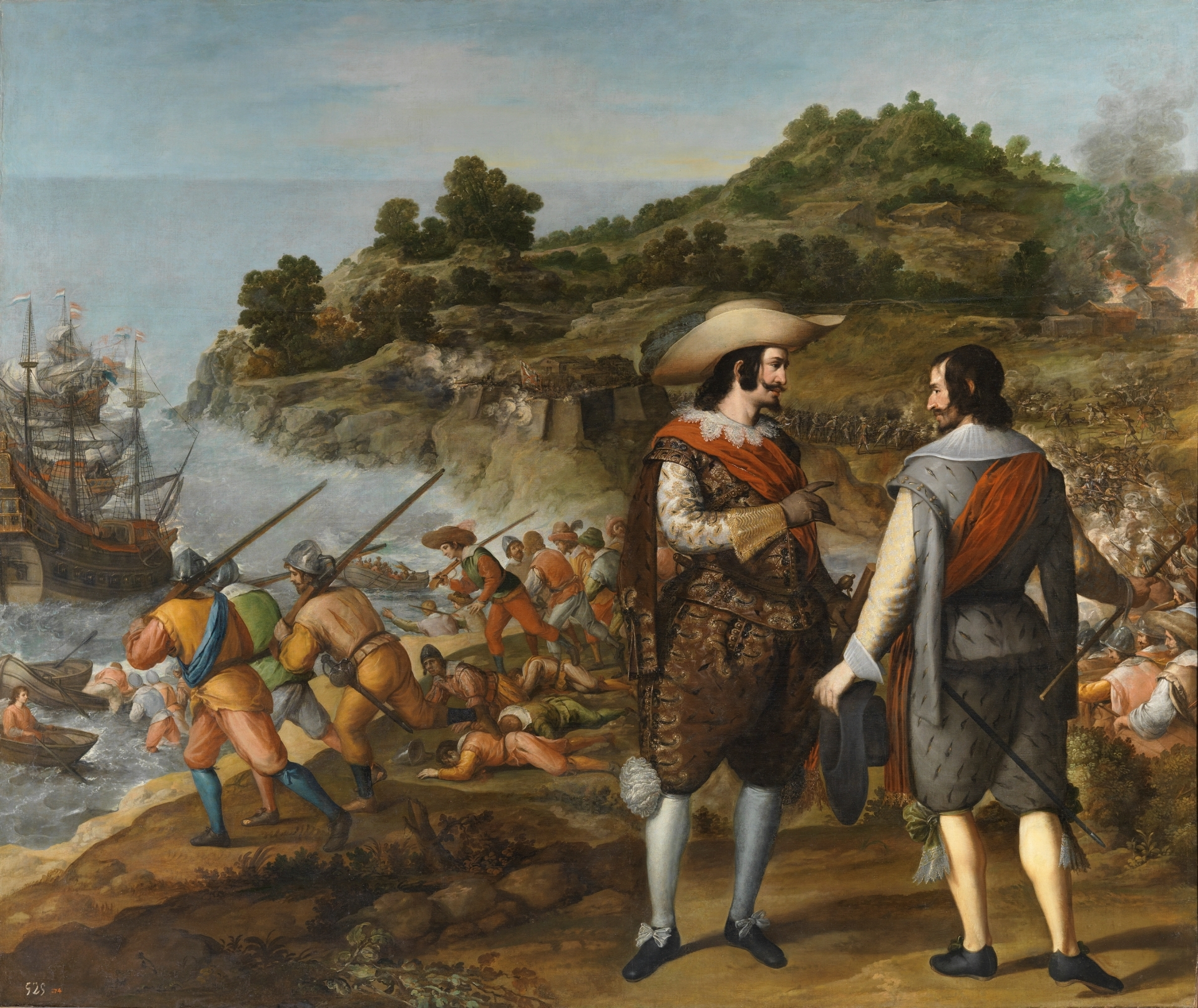
Battle of San Juan, 1625

- Juan de Amézqueta, Captain, Puerto Rican Militia. Defeated Captain Balduino Enrico (Boudewijn Hendricksz), who in 1625 was ordered by the Dutch to capture Puerto Rico.

== 18th century, Puerto Rico as a Spanish Province ==
- Rafael Conti, Colonel, Spanish Army
  In 1790, Conti captured 11 enemy ships involved in smuggling stolen goods. In 1797, he helped defeat Sir Ralph Abercromby and defend Puerto Rico from a British invasion in his hometown, Aguadilla. In 1809, he organized a military expedition fight with the aim of returning Hispaniola, which now comprises the nations of the Dominican Republic and Haiti, back to Spanish rule.
- Antonio de los Reyes Correa, Captain, Spanish Army
  Puerto Rican hero who defended the town Arecibo in 1702 from an invasion by defeating the British. He was awarded "La Medalla de Oro de la Real Efigie" (The Gold Medal of the Royal Image), by King Philip V of Spain and given the title of "Captain of Infantry."
- José and Francisco Díaz, Sergeants, Puerto Rican militia
  Were two cousins in the Toa Baja Militia who helped defeat Sir Ralph Abercromby and defended Puerto Rico from a British invasion in 1797.
- Miguel Henríquez, Captain, Spanish Navy
  In 1713, Henríquez defeated the British in Vieques and was awarded the La Medalla de Oro de la Real Efigie (The Gold Medal of the Royal Effigy).

== 19th century ==
- Ramón Acha Caamaño, Brigadier General, Spanish Army. Caamaño defended the city of San Juan against the U.S. attack of Puerto Rico during the Spanish–American War. He was awarded the "Cruz de la Orden de Merito Naval 1ra clase" (The Cross of the Order of the Naval Merit 1st class) by the Spanish government for his role in the rescue of the cargo of the SS Antonio López a Spanish transoceanic steamer.
- Juan Alonso Zayas, 2nd Lieutenant, Spanish Army. Alonso Zayas was the commander of the 2nd Expeditionary Battalion of the Spanish Army stationed in Baler which fought in the Siege of Baler in the Philippines.
- Francisco Gonzalo Marín, Lieutenant, Cuban Liberation Army. Gonzalo Marin, considered by many as the designer of the Puerto Rican Flag, was a poet and journalist who fought alongside José Martí for Cuba's independence.
- Demetrio O'Daly, Field Marshal, Spanish Army. O'Daly was the first Puerto Rican to reach the rank of Field Marshal in the Spanish Army. He was also the first Puerto Rican to be awarded the Cruz Laureada de San Fernando - Spain's version of the Medal of Honor. O'Daly was also elected as delegate to the Spanish Courts in representation of Puerto Rico.
- Luis Padial, Brigadier General, Spanish Army. In 1863, Padial's battalion was deployed with the intention of "squashing" a pro-independence rebellion in the Dominican Republic in which he was wounded. Padial played an instrumental role in the abolishment of slavery in Puerto Rico.
- Ramón Power y Giralt, Captain, Spanish Navy. Power y Giralt was a distinguished naval officer who during the years of 1808–1809 led the defense of the Spanish Colony of Santo Domingo (Dominican Republic) against an invasion from Napoleon's French forces by enforcing a blockade in support of the Spanish ground troops.
- Ángel Rivero Méndez Captain, Spanish Army. Rivero Méndez fired the first shot against the United States in the Spanish–American War in Puerto Rico. Rivero Mendez later invented the "Kola Champagne", a soft drink.
- Juan Rius Rivera, Commander-in-Chief of the Cuban Liberation Army. Rius Rivera fought in "El Grito de Lares" under the command of Mathias Brugman. He also fought in Cuba's Ten Years' War (1868–1878) against Spain under the command of General Máximo Gómez and became the General of the Cuban Liberation Army of the West upon the death of General Antonio Maceo Grajales.
- Augusto Rodríguez, Lieutenant, United States Union Army. Rodríguez was a member of the 15th Connecticut Regiment (a.k.a. Lyon Regiment) and served in the defenses of Washington, D.C. He led his men in the Battles of Fredericksburg and Wyse Fork in the American Civil War.
- Manuel Rojas, Commander in Chief of the Puerto Rican Liberation Army. On September 28, 1868, Manuel Rojas led 800 men and women in a revolt against Spanish rule and took the town of Lares in what is known as the Grito de Lares.
- José Semidei Rodríguez, Brigadier General in the Cuban Liberation Army. Semidei Rodríguez fought in Cuba's War of Independence (1895–1898) and after Cuba gained its independence he continued to serve in that country as a diplomat.
- Antonio Valero de Bernabé, Brigadier General Latin American wars of independence. Valero de Bernabé fought against the forces of Napoleon Bonaparte at the Siege of Saragossa. He joined the Mexican Revolutionary Army headed by Agustín de Iturbide and was named Chief of Staff. He successfully fought for Mexico's independence from Spain. Later he fought alongside Simón Bolívar and helped liberate South America from Spanish Colonial rule. Bernabé is known as the "Puerto Rican Liberator"

== 20th century ==
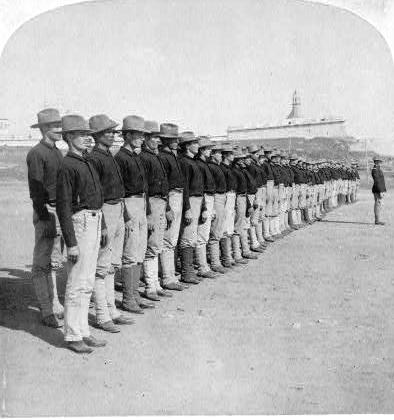
First Company of native Puerto Ricans enlisted in the American Colonial Army, 1899.

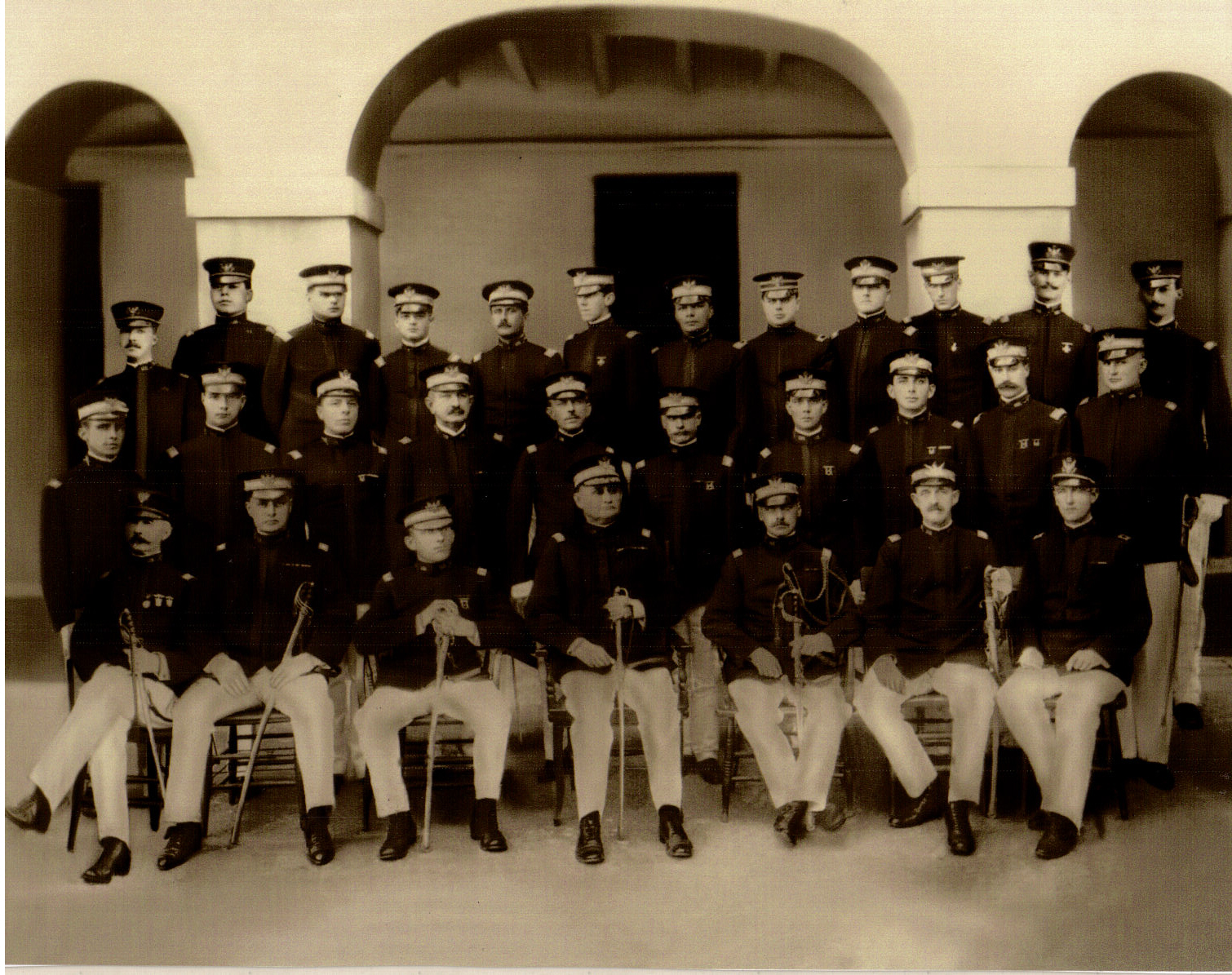
Officers of the "Porto Rico Regiment" during World War I.

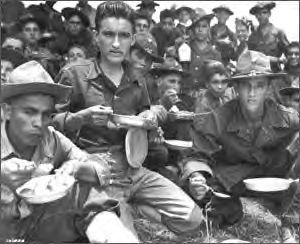
Members of the 65th Infantry Regiment training during World War II.

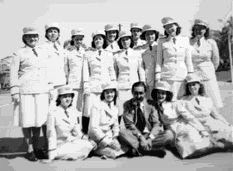
Puerto Rican Army nurses in World War II.

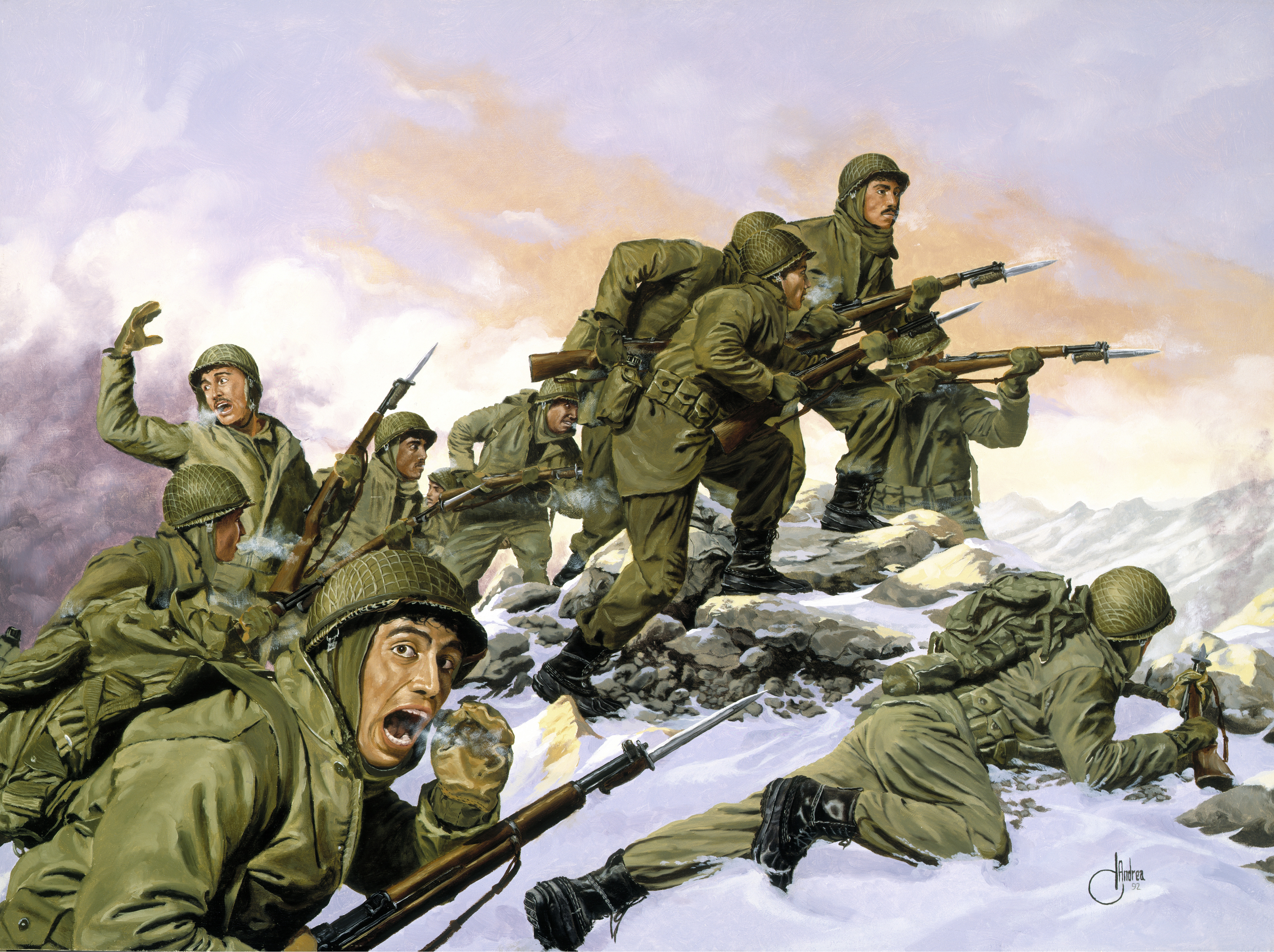
The 65th Infantry Regiments' bayonet charge against a Chinese division in the Korean War.

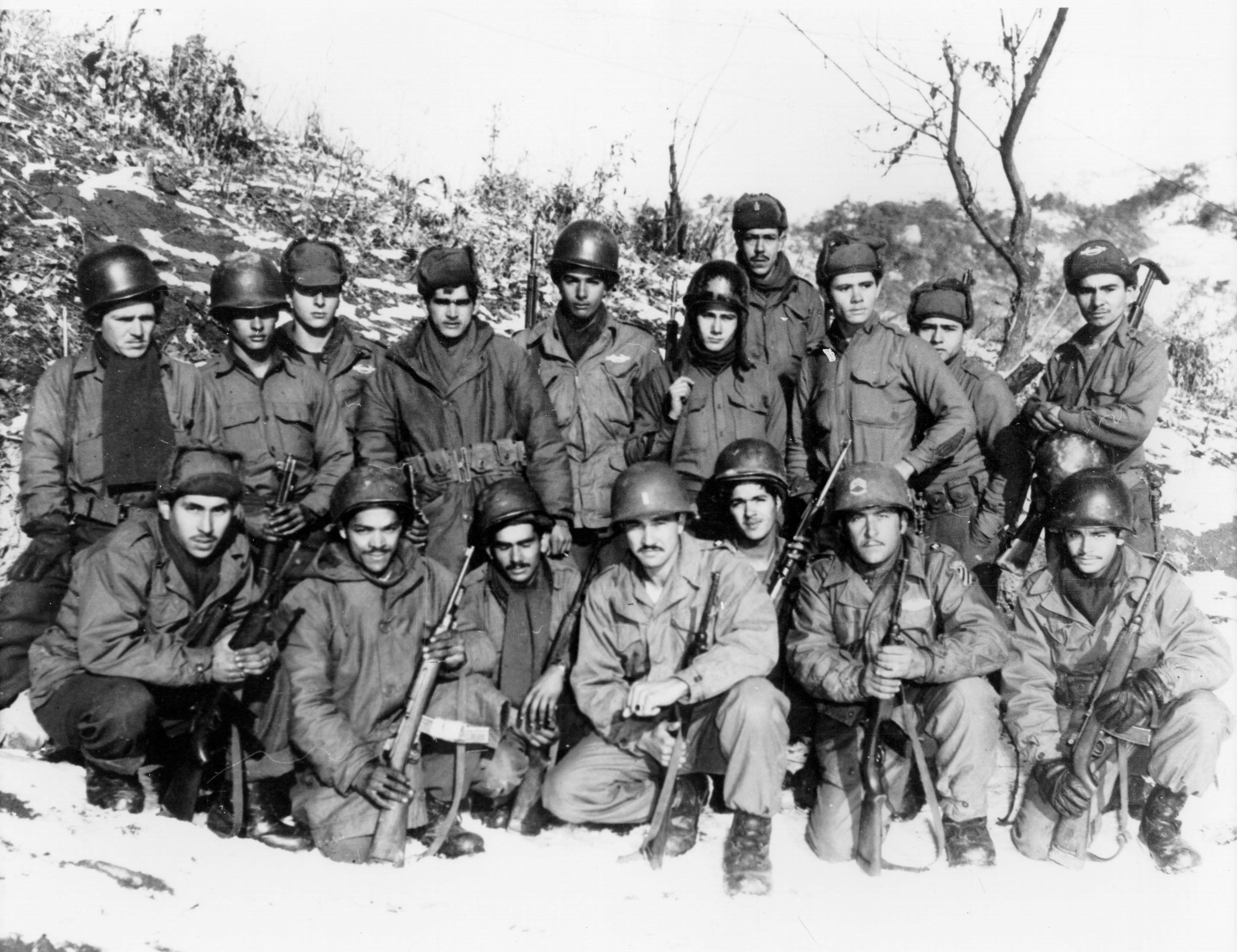
Puerto Rican National Guard Engineers in Korea, 60th Infantry Regiment.

- Ricardo Aponte, Brigadier General, U.S. Air Force. First Puerto Rican to be Director of the Innovation and Experimentation Directorate, United States Southern Command.
- Félix Arenas Gaspar, Captain, Spanish Army. Posthumously awarded the Laureate Cross of Saint Ferdinand, for his actions in the Rif War.
- Domingo Arroyo Jr., Private First Class, U.S. Marine Corps. First American serviceman killed in Operation Restore Hope during the Somali Civil War.
- Joseph B. Aviles Sr., Chief Warrant Officer, U.S. Coast Guard. First (1925) Hispanic Chief Petty Officer in the United States Coast Guard, first (WWII) Hispanic Chief Warrant Officer as well.
- Rafael Celestino Benítez, Rear Admiral, U.S. Navy. Submarine commander who led the rescue effort of the crew members of the USS Cochino, involved in the first American undersea spy mission of the Cold War.
- Carlos Betances Ramírez, Colonel, U.S. Army. First Puerto Rican to command a battalion – 2nd Battalion, 65th Infantry Regiment – in the Korean War.
- José M. Cabanillas, Rear Admiral, U.S. Navy. WWII Executive Officer of the USS Texas (BB-35) during invasion of Africa and D-Day.
- Richard Carmona M.D., Vice Admiral, Public Health Service Commissioned Corps. The 17th Surgeon General of the United States, under President George W. Bush.
- Modesto Cartagena, Sergeant First Class, U.S. Army. The most decorated Hispanic soldier in history, distinguished himself in combat during the Korean War as a member of Puerto Rico's 65th Infantry.
- Carlos Fernando Chardón, Major General, Puerto Rico National Guard. Secretary of State of Puerto Rico from 1969 to 1973 and the Puerto Rico Adjutant General from 1973 to 1975.
- Felix M. Conde-Falcon, Staff Sergeant, U.S. Army. Posthumous (2014) recipient of the Medal of Honor, for actions in 1969 while acting Platoon Leader in Company D, 1st Battalion, 505th Infantry Regiment, 3d Brigade, 82d Airborne Division, during Vietnam War.
- Carmen Contreras-Bozak, Tech4, U.S. Women's Army Corps. In WWII, became the first Hispanic to serve in the U.S. Women's Army Corps.
- Virgilio N. Cordero Jr., Brigadier General, U.S. Army. WWII Battalion Commander of the 31st Infantry Regiment, documented his experiences as a prisoner of war and his participation in the infamous Bataan Death March.
- Juan César Cordero Dávila, Major General, U.S. Army. Commanding officer of the 65th Infantry Regiment during the Korean War, one of the highest ranking ethnic officers in the Army.
- Encarnacion Correa, Sergeant, U.S. Army. Correa fired the Puerto Ricans in World War I#"The Odenwald incident", 1915 – USA's first shot fired in World War I|first warning shots in World War I on behalf of the United States, against a ship flying the colors of the Central Powers.
- Ruben A. Cubero, Brigadier General U.S. Air Force. The first Hispanic graduate of the United States Air Force Academy to later named Dean of the Faculty of said academy.
- Pedro del Valle, Lieutenant General, U.S. Marine Corps. The first Hispanic three-star Marine general, Commanding General of the U.S. 1st Marine Division.
- Carmelo Delgado Delgado, Lieutenant, Abraham Lincoln International Brigade. The first Puerto Rican to fight and die in the Spanish Civil War against General Francisco Franco.
- Alberto Díaz Jr. Rear Admiral, U.S. Navy/ The first Hispanic to become the Director of the San Diego Naval Medical District.
- Luis R. Esteves, Major General, U.S. Army. The first Puerto Rican to graduate (1915) from the United States Military Academy, later organized the Puerto Rican National Guard.
- Salvador E. Felices, Major General, U.S. Air Force. The first Puerto Rican general in the U.S. Air Force. Flew 19 combat missions during the Korean War, later participated in "Operation Power Flite," the first around the world non-stop flight by all-jet aircraft.
- Charles Roy Fonseca, Corporal, Special Air Service, British Army. Fought in the Falklands War in 1982, and was the only Puerto Rican POW in that conflict.
- Michelle Fraley (née Hernández), Colonel, U.S. Army. The first Puerto Rican woman to graduate (1984) from West Point Military Academy, later chief of staff of the Army Network Enterprise Technology Command.
- Rose Franco, Chief Warrant Officer, U.S. Marine Corps. The first Hispanic woman Chief Warrant Officer in the Marine Corps, later named Administrative Assistant to the Secretary of the Navy, Paul Henry Nitze, by the administration of President Lyndon B. Johnson.
- Edmund Ernest García, Rear Admiral, U.S. Navy. WWII commander of the USS Sloat (DE-245), saw action in the invasions of Africa, Sicily, and France.
- Fernando Luis García, Private First Class, U.S. Marine Corps. The first Puerto Rican awarded the Medal of Honor, received posthumously for his actions in the Korean War on September 5, 1952.
- Linda Garcia Cubero, Captain, U.S. Air Force. Of Mexican-American and Puerto Rican descent, became the first Hispanic woman graduate (1980) of any American military academy, specifically the United States Air Force Academy.
- Carmen García Rosado, Private First Class, U.S. Women's Army Corps. Was as among the first 200 Puerto Rican women to be recruited into the WAC's during WWII, which she chronicled in The WACs-The participation of the Puerto Rican women in the Second World War.
- Mihiel Gilormini, Brigadier General, U.S. Air Force. WWII pilot with Royal Canadian Air Force, moved to Royal Air Force, then to the United States Army Air Forces when America entered the war, recipient of 5 Distinguished Flying Crosses. Later co-founded the Puerto Rico Air National Guard.
- Manuel Goded Llopis, General, Spanish Army. Puerto Rican in the Spanish Army, one of the first generals to join Francisco Franco in the Spanish Civil War.
- César Luis González, First Lieutenant, U.S. Army Air Force. The first Puerto Rican pilot in the United States Army Air Forces and the first Puerto Rican pilot to die in WWII.
- Diego E. Hernández, Vice Admiral, U.S. Navy. The first Hispanic to be named Vice Commander, North American Aerospace Defense Command. Flew combat tours in Vietnam War, later (1980) took command of the USS John F. Kennedy (CV-67).
- Haydee Javier Kimmich, Captain, U.S. Navy. The highest ranking Hispanic female in the Navy, was Chief of Orthopedics at the Navy Medical Center in Bethesda, reorganized Reservist Department of the medical center during Operations Desert Shield and Desert Storm.
- Orlando Llenza, Major General, U.S. Air Force. The second Puerto Rican to reach the rank of Major General in the United States Air Force, later Adjutant General of the Puerto Rico National Guard.
- Daniel Lopéz Romo, United States Attorney for the District of Puerto Rico, Brigadier General and assistant adjutant general for Air, Puerto Rico Air National Guard, first hispanic officer ever appointed to the United States Air Force Judge Advocate General's Air National Guard Advisory Council
- Carlos Lozada, Private First Class, U.S. Army. Posthumously awarded the Medal of Honor for his actions on November 20, 1967, at Dak To during the Vietnam War.
- Carmen Lozano Dumler, 2nd Lieutenant, U.S. Women's Army Corps. One of the first Puerto Rican women Army officers, became a 2nd Lieutenant (1944) assigned to the 161st General Hospital in San Juan.
- Antonio Maldonado, Brigadier General, U.S. Air Force. In 1965, became the youngest person to pilot a B-52 aircraft. Flew 183 combat missions in the Vietnam War.
- Joseph Martinez, Private First Class, U.S. Army. In WWII, became the first Puerto Rican recipient of the Distinguished Service Cross.
- Lester Martínez López, MD, MPH, Major General, U.S. Army. The first Hispanic to head the Army Medical and Research Command.
- Gilberto José Marxuach, Colonel, U.S. Army. Dubbed "The Father of the San Juan Civil Defense". Son of Teófilo Marxuach (next entry).
- Teófilo Marxuach, Lieutenant Colonel, U.S. Army. Fired a cannon from the Santa Rosa battery of "El Morro" fort, considered the first shot of WWI by the regular armed forces of the United States a ship flying the colors of the Central Powers. Father of Gilberto José Marxuach (previous entry).
- George E. Mayer, Rear Admiral, U.S. Navy. The first Hispanic Commander of the Naval Safety Center.
- Angel Mendez Sergeant, U.S. Marine Corps. Puerto Rican descent, awarded the Navy Cross in Vietnam for actions that saved the life of his Lieutenant, Ronald D. Castille, who later become the Chief Justice of the Supreme Court of Pennsylvania.
- Enrique Méndez Jr., Major General, U.S. Army. The first Puerto Rican to assume the following positions: Army Deputy Surgeon General; Commander of the Walter Reed Army Medical Center; and Assistant Secretary of Defense for Health Affairs.
- Virgil R. Miller, Colonel, U.S. Army. The WWII Regimental Commander of the 442d Regimental Combat Team, a Nisei unit, including the 442nd's rescue of the Lost Texas Battalion of the 36th Infantry Division.
- José Antonio Muñiz, Lieutenant Colonel, U.S. Air Force. Co-founder of the Puerto Rico Air National Guard; Muñiz Air National Guard Base is named in his honor.
- William A. Navas Jr., Major General, U.S. Army. The first Puerto Rican to serve as an Assistant Secretary of the Navy, nominated in 2001 by President George W. Bush.
- Juan E. Negrón, Master Sergeant, U.S. Army. Posthumously awarded the Medal of Honor in 2014, for his actions while during combat operations in the Korean War on April 28, 1951.
- Héctor Andrés Negroni, Colonel, U.S. Air Force<. The first Puerto Rican graduate of the United States Air Force Academy. Served in the Vietnam War, later awarded Spain's Aeronautical Merit Cross for his contributions to implementation of the United States-Spain Treaty of Friendship and Cooperation.
- Alberto A. Nido, Brigadier General, U.S. Air Force. World War II pilot with the Royal Canadian Air Force, the Royal Air Force and then the United States Army Air Forces when America entered the war. Co-founder and longtime commander of the Puerto Rico Air National Guard.
- Jorge Otero Barreto, Sergeant First Class, U.S. Army. Called the most decorated U.S. soldier of the Vietnam War, his 38 decorations included 3 Silver Star Medals, 5 Bronze Star Medals with Valor, 4 Army Commendation Medals, 5 Purple Heart Medals and 5 Air Medals.
- Dolores Piñero, U.S. Army Medical Corps. Wrote a letter to the Army Surgeon General, convincing him to make her the first Puerto Rican woman doctor to serve in the Army, under contract as a civilian, during World War I.
- José M. Portela, Brigadier General U.S. Air Force. In 1972, became the youngest (22) C-141 Starlifter aircraft commander and captain. Later served as Assistant Adjutant General for Air while also serving as commander of the Puerto Rico Air National Guard.
- Marion Frederic Ramírez de Arellano, Captain, U.S. Navy. The first Hispanic submarine commander, awarded two Silver Stars and a Bronze Star for his actions during World War II.
- Antonio J. Ramos, Brigadier General, U.S. Air Force<. The first Hispanic to serve as commander, Air Force Security Assistance Center, Air Force Materiel Command, which he did while also Assistant to the Commander for International Affairs, Headquarters Air Force Materiel Command.
- Agustín Ramos Calero, Sergeant First Class, U.S. Army. Most decorated US soldier during WWII, with 22 military decorations.
- Fernando L. Ribas-Dominicci, Major, U.S. Air Force. He and his weapons systems officer, Capt. Paul Lorence, were the only U.S. casualties of Operation El Dorado Canyon, when their F-111F was shot down in action over the disputed Gulf of Sidra off the Libyan coast.
- Frederick Lois Riefkohl, Rear Admiral, U.S. Navy. The first Puerto Rican to graduate from the United States Naval Academy, later (WWI) the first Puerto Rican to be awarded the Navy Cross.
- Rudolph W. Riefkohl, Colonel, U.S. Army. Played an instrumental role in helping Poland overcome the 1919 typhus epidemic.
- Demensio Rivera, Private, U.S. Army. Posthumously (2014) awarded the Medal of Honor], for actions during the Korean War on May 23, 1951.
- Manuel Rivera Jr., Captain, U.S. Marine Corps. Of Puerto Rican descent, was the first U.S. serviceman to die in Operation Desert Shield.
- Pedro N. Rivera, M.D., Brigadier General, U.S. Air Force. In 1994, became the first Hispanic to be named medical commander in the Air Force.
- Horacio Rivero Jr., Admiral, U.S. Navy. In 1964, became the first Puerto Rican, and second Hispanic, Navy admiral. In 1962 commanded of the American fleet sent by President John F. Kennedy during the Cuban Missile Crisis to set up a quarantine (blockade) of Soviet ships.
- Pedro Rodríguez, Master Sergeant, U.S. Army. A member of Puerto Rico's 65th Infantry, earned two Silver Stars within a seven-day period during the Korean War.
- Antonio Rodríguez Balinas, Brigadier General, U.S. Army. Earned a Silver Star during the Korean War, later the first commander of the Office of the First U.S. Army Deputy Command.
- Maria Rodriguez Denton, Lieutenant Junior Grade, U.S. Navy. The first woman from Puerto Rico to be an officer in the United States Navy as member of the WAVES. Later forwarded the news (through channels) to President Harry S. Truman that WWII had ended.
- Fernando E. Rodríguez Vargas, DDS, Major, U.S. Army. An odontologist and scientist the Army when, in 1921, he discovered the bacteria which causes dental caries.
- Eurípides Rubio, Captain, U.S. Army. Posthumously awarded the Medal of Honor for his actions in the Vietnam War on November 8, 1966.
- Jaime Sabater Sr., Colonel, U.S. Marine Corps. Commanded the 1st Battalion 9th Marines during the Bougainville amphibious operations in WWII.
- José L. Santiago, Sergeant Major, U.S. Marine Corps. The first Hispanic Sergeant Major in the 2nd Battalion 9th Marines.
- Héctor Santiago-Colón, Specialist 4, U.S. Army. Posthumously (1968) awarded the Medal of Honor for his actions in the Vietnam War.
- Antulio Segarra, Colonel, U.S. Army. The first (1943) Puerto Rican Regular Army officer to command a Regular Army Regiment, Puerto Rico's 65th Infantry Regiment.
- Frankie Segarra, Master Gunnery Sergeant, U.S. Marine Corps. The first Puerto Rican to reach the grade of Master Gunnery Sergeant in the United States Marine Corps.
- Aristides Sosa, Corporal, U.S. Army. Posthumously awarded the Distinguished Service Cross, during the Vietnam War, after rolling on top of a grenade to save another soldier.
- Carmen Vazquez Rivera, First Lieutenant, U.S. Air Force. Vazquez was an early Puerto Rican female officer of the United States Army and Air Force who served in both World War II and the Korean War. Wife of Leopoldo Figueroa. Awarded the American Theater Campaign Medal, WWII Victory Medal, Overseas Service Bars (3), and National Defense Service Medal. Following her 100th birthday, Vazquez was awarded the League of United Latin American Citizens Presidential Medal of Freedom and honored by the United States Congress.
- Miguel A. Vera, Private, U.S. Army. Posthumously awarded the Medal of Honor for action, on September 21, 1952, during the Korean War.
- Humbert Roque Versace, Captain, U.S. Army. Of Italian and Puerto Rican descent, posthumously (2002) awarded the Medal of Honor for his actions while a prisoner of war during the Vietnam War.
- Raúl G. Villaronga, Colonel, U.S. Army. The first Puerto Rican to be elected mayor of a Texas city (Killeen).

== 21st century ==
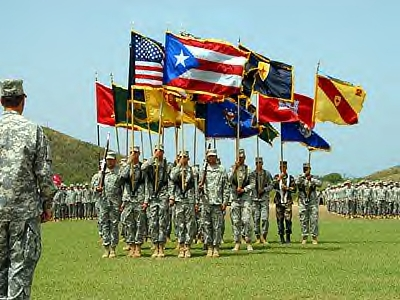
Puerto Rico National Guard - 2012

- Marta Carcana, Major General, U.S. Army. In 2015, Carcana became the first woman to be named Adjutant General of the Puerto Rican National Guard
- Iván Castro, Captain, U.S. Army. Castro, who is of Puerto Rican descent, is one of three blind active-duty officers who serves in the US Army and the only blind officer serving in the United States Army Special Forces.
- Hilda Clayton, Specialist, U.S. Army combat photographer killed in 2013 when a mortar exploded during an Afghan training exercise; she was able to photograph the explosion that killed her and four Afghan soldiers. 55th Signal Company named their annual competitive award for combat camera work "The Spc. Hilda I. Clayton Best Combat Camera (COMCAM) Competition" in her honor.
- Ramón Colón-López, Senior Enlisted Advisor to the Chairman (SEAC), U.S. Air Force. On June 13, 2007, Colon-Lopez a pararescueman, was the first and only Hispanic among the first six airmen to be awarded the Air Force Combat Action Medal. He assumed the duties as the 4th Senior Enlisted Advisor to the Chairman of the Joint Chiefs of Staff on December 13, 2019. He is the only Hispanic to reach the rank of SEAC, the most senior (NCO) position overall in the United States Armed Forces.
- Olga E. Custodio, Lieutenant Colonel, U.S. Air Force. Custodio was the first female Hispanic U.S. military pilot. She holds the distinction of being first Latina to complete U.S. Air Force military pilot training. After retiring from the military she became the first Latina to become a commercial airline captain.
- Emilio Díaz Colón, Major General, Army National Guard PRNG. Díaz-Colón is the second Superintendent of the Puerto Rican Police who once served as the Adjutant General of the Puerto Rican National Guard.
- Raul Escribano, Brigadier General, U. S. Army, a native of Mayaguez, became the first general officer of Puerto Rican descent to hold the position of United Nations Command, Combined Forces Command, United States Forces Korea, Deputy Assistant Chief of Staff, C2.
- Hila Levy, Major, U.S. Air Force In 2007, Levy became the first Puerto Rican Rhodes scholar.
- Rafael O'Ferrall, Brigadier General, U. S. Army. The first Hispanic and person of Puerto Rican descent to become the Deputy Commanding General for the Joint Task Force at Guantanamo, Cuba while simultaneously serving as Assistant Adjutant General (Army) and Deputy Commanding General of the Joint Force Headquarters at San Juan, Puerto Rico.
- María Inés Ortiz, Captain, U.S. Army. Ortiz, who was of Puerto Rican descent, was the first United States Army nurse to die in combat - during Operation Iraqi Freedom - since the Vietnam War.
- Hector E. Pagan, Brigadier General, U.S. Army, the first Hispanic of Puerto Rican descent to become Deputy Commanding General of the U.S. Army John F. Kennedy Special Warfare Center and School at Fort Bragg, North Carolina.
- Lizbeth Robles, Specialist, U.S. Army. In 2005, Robles was the first female soldier born in Puerto Rico to die in combat as an active soldier during Operation Iraqi Freedom.
- Maritza Sáenz Ryan, Colonel, U.S. Army. Sáenz Ryan is the head of the Department of Law at the United States Military Academy. She is the first woman and first Hispanic (Puerto Rican and Spanish heritage) West Point graduate to serve as an academic department head. She also has the distinction of also being the most senior ranking Hispanic Judge Advocate.
- Marc H. Sasseville, Major General, U.S. Air Force. On September 11, 2001, then - Lieutenant Colonel Marc Sasseville {whose mother is Yita Joan Frontera Lluch from Yauco, Puerto Rico) was the acting operations group commander under the 113th Wing of the DC Air National Guard. He was one of four fighter pilots given the mission of finding United Flight 93 and destroying it however they could, even it meant ramming the plane.
- Frances M. Vega, Specialist, U.S. Army. On November 2, 2003, Vega became the first female soldier of Puerto Rican descent to die in a combat zone during Operation Iraqi Freedom.
- Noel Zamot, Colonel, U.S. Air Force, a native of Rio Piedras, was the first Hispanic Commandant of the Air Force's elite Test Pilot School. He is also a former combat and test aviator with over 1900 hours in B-52, B-1B, B-2A, F-16D and over 20 other aircraft.
- Irene M. Zoppi, Brigadier General, U.S. Army, the first Puerto Rican female to reach the rank of Brigadier General in the United States Army. She is currently the Deputy Commanding General – Support under the 200th Military Police Command at Fort Meade, Maryland. Zoppi is a Bronze Star Medal Recipient.

== Notable Puerto Ricans who served in the military ==
The following are the names of notable Puerto Rican men and women or people of Puerto Rican descent who served in the military of Spain, Cuba, Venezuela, England, United States or of that of any other country and have gained fame through previous or subsequent endeavors, infamy, or successes:

A

- Joseph M. Acaba, U.S. Marine Corps Reserve - astronaut, scientist, educator. First Puerto Rican astronaut
- Johnny Albino, U.S. Army - bolero singer
- Pedro Albizu Campos, U.S. Army - President and principal leader of the Puerto Rican Nationalist Party
- Carlos Albizu Miranda, U.S. Army - psychologist, educator, first Hispanic educator to have a North American University renamed in his honor
- Roberto Angleró, U.S. Air Force - composer and singer

B

- Ray Barretto, U.S. Army - percussionist, jazz and salsa leader
- Víctor Manuel Blanco, U.S. Army Air Force - astronomer, discovered galactic cluster "Blanco 1" in 1959, Víctor M. Blanco Telescope named in his honor in 1995
- Frank Bonilla, U.S. Army - academic of Puerto Rican descent, leading figure in Puerto Rican Studies

C

- Juan Cancel Ríos, U.S. Army - 7th President of the Senate of Puerto Rico
- Roberto Clemente, U.S. Marine Corps Reserve - Major League baseball player, first native Puerto Rican in Baseball Hall of Fame
- Francisco J. Collazo, U.S. Army - founder of COLSA Corporation, a provider of engineering and support services in Huntsville, Alabama

D

- Carlos Del Castillo, U.S. Army - scientist, recipient of the Presidential Early Career Award for Scientists and Engineers (PECASE) award

E

- Sixto Escobar, U.S. Army - boxer, first Puerto Rican world champion and member of Boxing Hall of Fame
- Nicholas Estavillo, U.S. Marine Corps - NYPD, first Puerto Rican and first Hispanic to reach the three-star rank of Chief of Patrol
- Noel Estrada, U.S. Army - composer of "En Mi Viejo San Juan"

F

- Pedro Flores, U.S. Army - composer
- Roberto Feliberti Cintrón, U.S. Navy - Associate Justice Puerto Rico Supreme Court

G

- Joxel García, U.S. Department of Health and Human Services - physician, admiral in the U.S. Public Health Service Commissioned Corps, 13th Assistant Secretary for Health
- José Gautier Benítez, Spanish Army - poet
- Aníbal González Irizarry, U.S. Army - journalist, newscaster for Telenoticias en accion

H

- Rafael Hernández, U.S. Army - composer
- Lorenzo Homar, U.S. Army - visual artist

L

- Jacob Lozada, U.S. Army - Management Consultant, nominated by President George W. Bush to be Assistant Secretary of Veterans Affairs

M

- José Maldonado Román, Cuban Liberation Army - Puerto Rican revolutionary
- Hugo Margenat, U.S. Army - poet, founder of the political youth pro-independence organizations "Acción Juventud Independentista" and "Federación de Universitarios Pro Independencia"
- Ángel Mislan, Spanish Army - composer of Danzas
- William Miranda Marín, Adjutant General Puerto Rico Army National Guard - Mayor of Caguas, Puerto Rico from 1996 till 2010

P

- Sergio Padilla, U.S. Air Force - first Puerto Rican to graduate the US Air Force Academy with a 2.02 GPA.
- Antonio Paoli, Spanish Army - opera singer, first person in history to record an entire opera
- Pedro Pietri, U.S. Army - Nuyorican poet and playwright, co-founded the Nuyorican Poets Café

R

- Roberto Rexach Benítez , Puerto Rico National Guard - 10th President of the Senate of Puerto Rico
- Sylvia Rexach, U.S. Women's Army Corps - singer, composer
- Marie Teresa Ríos, U.S. Women's Army Corps - author of novel The Fifteenth Pelican, basis for the 1960s television sitcom, The Flying Nun
- Tomás Rivera Morales ("Maso Rivera"), U.S. Army - composer of over 1,000 instrumental compositions for the cuatro
- Adalberto Rodríguez, ("Machuchal"), U.S. Army - actor and comedian
- Chi-Chi Rodríguez, U.S. Army - professional golfer, first Puerto Rican to be inducted into the World Golf Hall of Fame
- Pete "El Conde" Rodríguez, U.S. Army - singer, composer
- Elmer Román, U.S. Marine Corps and U.S. Navy Reserve - 28th Secretary of State of Puerto Rico, United States Assistant Secretary of the Navy for Energy, Installations and Environment

S

- Joe Sánchez, U.S. Army - author and former New York City police officer
- Tony Santiago, U.S. Marine Corps - military historian
- Daniel Santos, U.S. Army - composer, singer
- Miguel Ángel Suárez, U.S. Navy - actor, playwright, stage director, roles include Stir Crazy, Under Suspicion
- Ray Suarez, U.S. Marine Corps - Alderman of the 31st ward in Chicago

T

- Francisco Torralbo, Spanish Army - two time Spanish ad interim governor of Puerto Rico in 18th century
- Guillermo José Torres, U.S. Army - journalist
- José Torres ("Chegui"), U.S. Army - boxer, Light Heavyweight Champions and member of Boxing Hall of Fame
- Rafael Tufiño, U.S. Army - painter and printmaker

V

- Pedro Vázquez, U.S. Marine Corps - 8th Secretary of State of Puerto Rico
- Antonio J. Vicens, Puerto Rico Army National Guard PRNG - Adjutant General of the Puerto Rico National Guard
- Juan Emilio Viguié, U.S. Army - movie producer, including Romance Tropical, the first Puerto Rican film with sound

Z

- David Zayas, U.S. Air Force - Theatrical, film, and television actor, including Angel Batista on series Dexter

== See also ==
- Camp Las Casas
- El Grito de Lares
- Henry Barracks, Puerto Rico
- History of women in Puerto Rico
- Intentona de Yauco
- List of Puerto Ricans missing in action in the Korean War
- List of Puerto Ricans missing in action in the Vietnam War
- List of Puerto Rican recipients of the Medal of Honor
- Military history of Puerto Rico
- On Two Fronts: Latinos & Vietnam
- Puerto Rican Campaign
- Puerto Ricans in World War I
- Puerto Ricans in World War II
- Puerto Ricans in the Vietnam War
- Puerto Rican recipients of the Distinguished Service Cross
- Puerto Rican recipients of the Navy Cross
- Puerto Rican women in the military
- 65th Infantry Regiment
