= Félix Arenas Gaspar =

Puerto Rican Spanish Army captain

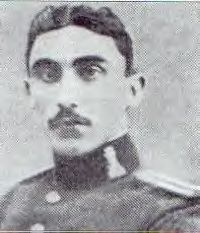
- Capt. Gaspar and Demetrio O'Daly are the only Puerto Ricans to be awarded the Cruz Laureada de San Fernando
- Born: December 13, 1891; San Juan, Puerto Rico
- Died: July 29, 1921 (aged 29); Tistutin, Morocco
- Military career
- Allegiance: Spain
- Branch: Spanish Army
- Service years: 1906–1921
- Rank: Captain of Engineers
- Commands: 2nd Company of Zapadores in Melilla
- Conflicts: Rif War: Battle of Annual
- Awards: Cruz Laureada de San Fernando (Laureate Cross of Saint Ferdinand)

Captain Félix Arenas Gaspar (December 13, 1891 – July 29, 1921), a Puerto Rican, was a captain in the Spanish Army who was posthumously awarded the Cruz Laureada de San Fernando for his actions in the Rif War.

The Cruz Laureada de San Fernando (Laureate Cross of Saint Ferdinand) is the highest military decoration awarded by the Spanish government. It is bestowed on a member of the Spanish armed forces who distinguishes himself during combat. It is Spain's equivalent to the American Medal of Honor.

== Early years ==
Arenas Gaspar was born in San Juan, the capital of Puerto Rico, when the island was still a Spanish colony. His father Félix Arenas Gaspar, Sr. was a captain of an artillery division stationed in the island. His family moved to Spain when Puerto Rico became a possession of the United States as an outcome of the Treaty of Paris of 1898 which concluded the Spanish–American War. They settled in the town of Molina de Aragón, where his family originally came from, and there he received his primary and secondary education.

== Military career ==
In 1906, Arenas Gaspar entered the Military Academy of Engineers of Guadalajara, Spain and earned his degree and lieutenant of engineer's commission in the Spanish Army in 1911. He was assigned to Aerostation Service and in 1913 earned his Balloon Pilot Badge. In October 1913, he was assigned to the Aerostation Company of Tetuan and served in North Africa where he was involved in active combat.

From 1914 to 1917 he attended the Superior School of War, during which time (1915) he was promoted to the rank of Captain of Engineers. In 1919, Arenas Gaspar was given the command of the 2nd Company of Zapadores in Melilla. Melilla is a city under Spanish rule located on the Mediterranean, on the Moroccan coast.

=== Rif War ===
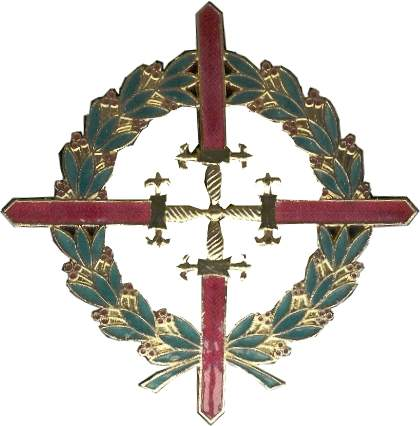
Cruz Laureada de San Fernando

In 1919, a rebellion against Spanish colonial rule took place in Spanish Morocco, a Spanish protectorate in what is known as the Rif War. In July 1921, many Spanish military outposts fell to the Riffian rebels, as part of the disaster of Annual, and Arenas Gaspar together with a lieutenant colonel by the name of Ugarte headed towards the town and fort of Dar Dríus. During their journey they encountered members of a Spanish squadron retreating from Dar Dríus, who informed them that the passageway was blocked. Arenas Gaspar joined the squadron, which included many of their wounded, and headed towards Monte Arruit. After helping with the wounded, Arenas Gaspar decided to go to Tistutin to defend the Spanish position there, and to re-establish the telegraph service with Monte Arruit which had been interrupted.

Arena Gaspar's position was under constant enemy attack. He decided on the nights of July 25 and 26, to leave his parameter and set fire to the stacks of hay which served as the enemy's protective barriers. A member of his company by the name of Captain Aguirre and a squad of riflemen provided Arena Gaspar with the necessary firepower to cover him. He was severely burned when one the gasoline tanks which he was carrying blew up, but not before he killed ten of the enemy.

On July 29, the Spanish troops were ordered to retreat to the major fort at Monte Arruit. Arenas Gaspar volunteered to stay in the rear to cover the retreat with Capt. Aguirre and 200 men. They fought against the enemy until the Spanish troops were safely in Monte Arruit. Then they found themselves surrounded and outnumbered by the Riffians. They battled against the Riffians until Arenas Gaspar ordered Capt. Aguirre and the survivors to reach the Spanish position at Monte Arruit. Arenas Gaspar decided to stay and cover their retreat.

Arenas Gaspar took charge of one of the artillery batteries and opened fire, which halted the enemy advance and allowed his men to reach Monte Arruit. Unfortunately one of the Riffians was able to get close enough to Arenas Gaspar, shot him in the head, and killed him.

== Cruz Laureada de San Fernando ==
Various officers who witnessed the actions of Arenas Gaspar requested that he be posthumously awarded the Cruz Laureada de San Fernando. In 1924, Capt. Félix Arenas Gaspar was awarded the Cruz Laureada de San Fernando (Laureate Cross of Saint Fernand), the highest military decoration awarded by the Spanish government.

== Legacy ==
On July 5, 1928, King Alfonso XIII of Spain unveiled a bust with the likeness of Capt. Félix Arena Gaspar and named a street n his honor in the town of Molina de Aragon. In 1956, the city of Guadalajara named a street in his honor. In Melilla, Spain the military barracks Capitán Arenas was named in his honor. He is featured in the Who's Who in Ballooning.

== See also ==
- List of Puerto Ricans
- List of Puerto Rican military personnel
