= Hector E. Pagan =

United States Army officer

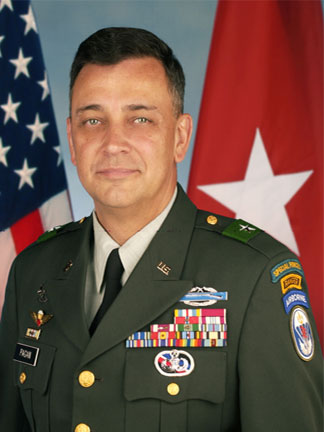
- Brigadier General Hector E. Pagan; Deputy Commanding General of the U.S.Army John F. Kennedy Special Warfare Center and School
- Born: 1957 (age 68–69); Manhattan, New York
- Military career
- Allegiance: United States of America
- Branch: United States Army
- Service years: 1979–2010
- Rank: Brigadier General
- Commands: Deputy Commanding General of the U.S.Army John F. Kennedy Special Warfare Center and School *Special Operations Command South
- Conflicts: Operation Just Cause; Operation Iraqi Freedom
- Awards: Defense Superior Service Medal; Legion of Merit; Bronze Star with bronze oak leaf

Brigadier General Hector E. Pagan (born 1957) is a United States Army officer who is the first Hispanic of Puerto Rican descent to become Deputy Commanding General of the U.S.Army John F. Kennedy Special Warfare Center and School at Fort Bragg, North Carolina.

== Early years ==
Pagan's parents moved to New York City in search of a better way of life. He was born in Manhattan, N.Y. and raised in Puerto Rico. He was commissioned as an infantry officer from the ROTC program at the University of Puerto Rico at Mayagüez upon his graduation in 1979, where he was a distinguished student and graduate.

== Military career ==
He attended the Infantry Officers Basic Course and Ranger School in 1980, and was assigned to the 1st Battalion, 51st Infantry, in Germany, as a Rifle Platoon Leader, Company Executive Officer and Scout Platoon Leader.

In 1983, he attended the Infantry Officers Advanced Course and remained at Fort Benning, Georgia, with the Infantry Training Group and the 29th Infantry Regiment, where he served as chief, Special Weapons Committee, operations officer, and commanded the Headquarters and Headquarters Company, 2nd Bn., 29th Infantry Regiment at Fort Benning, Georgia from 1984 to 1986. He volunteered to attend Special Forces training and was assigned to 7th Special Forces Group (Airborne) at Fort Bragg, North Carolina.

Pagan served in Panama with the 3rd Bn., 7th Special Forces Group (Airborne), 1988–1990, as an A-Detachment commander and Battalion S1. He served in Operation Just Cause which was the invasion of Panama by the United States that deposed general, dictator and de facto Panamanian military leader Manuel Noriega in December 1989, during the administration of U.S. President George H. W. Bush, and later that same year was deployed to El Salvador. From 1990 to 1992, he served in Special Forces Branch, Total Army Personnel Command as a future readiness officer and captains assignments officer.

He attended the Army Command and General Staff Course and then served as the executive officer, 1st Bn., 7th SF Group (Airborne). From 1994 to 1995, he served in the U.S. Army Special Operations Command as the chief, officer management, office of the deputy chief of staff for personnel. He returned to the 7th SF Group (Airborne) in 1995, where he served as group operations officer, executive officer and deputy commander. From 1998 to 2000, Pagan commanded the 2nd Battalion, 1st Special Forces Group (Airborne) at Fort Lewis, Washington. After his tour with the 1st SF Group, he was assigned to the Special Operations Command South, Naval Station Roosevelt Roads, Puerto Rico, where he served as the director of operations, J3, from 2000 to 2002. Here he earned the Navy Meritorious Unit Commendation.

Upon completion of the U.S. Army War College in 2003, Pagan took command of the 5th Special Forces Group (Airborne) in Baghdad, Iraq, Operation Iraqi Freedom. He led the 5th SF Group (Airborne) in combat as the commander of the Combined Joint Special Operations Task Force in the Arabian Peninsula for two combat tours in 2003 and 2004.

In 2005, Pagan served as the special assistant to the commander of the United States Special Operations Command at MacDill Air Force Base, Florida. In 2006, he assumed duties as the deputy director of the Operations Support Group in the Center for Special Operations in the U.S. Special Operations Command. Pagan became the deputy commander, U.S. Army Special Operations Command in November 2006 and in May 2007 assumed duties as deputy commander, U.S. Army John F. Kennedy Special Warfare Center at Fort Bragg, North Carolina.

=== Promotion to Brigadier General ===
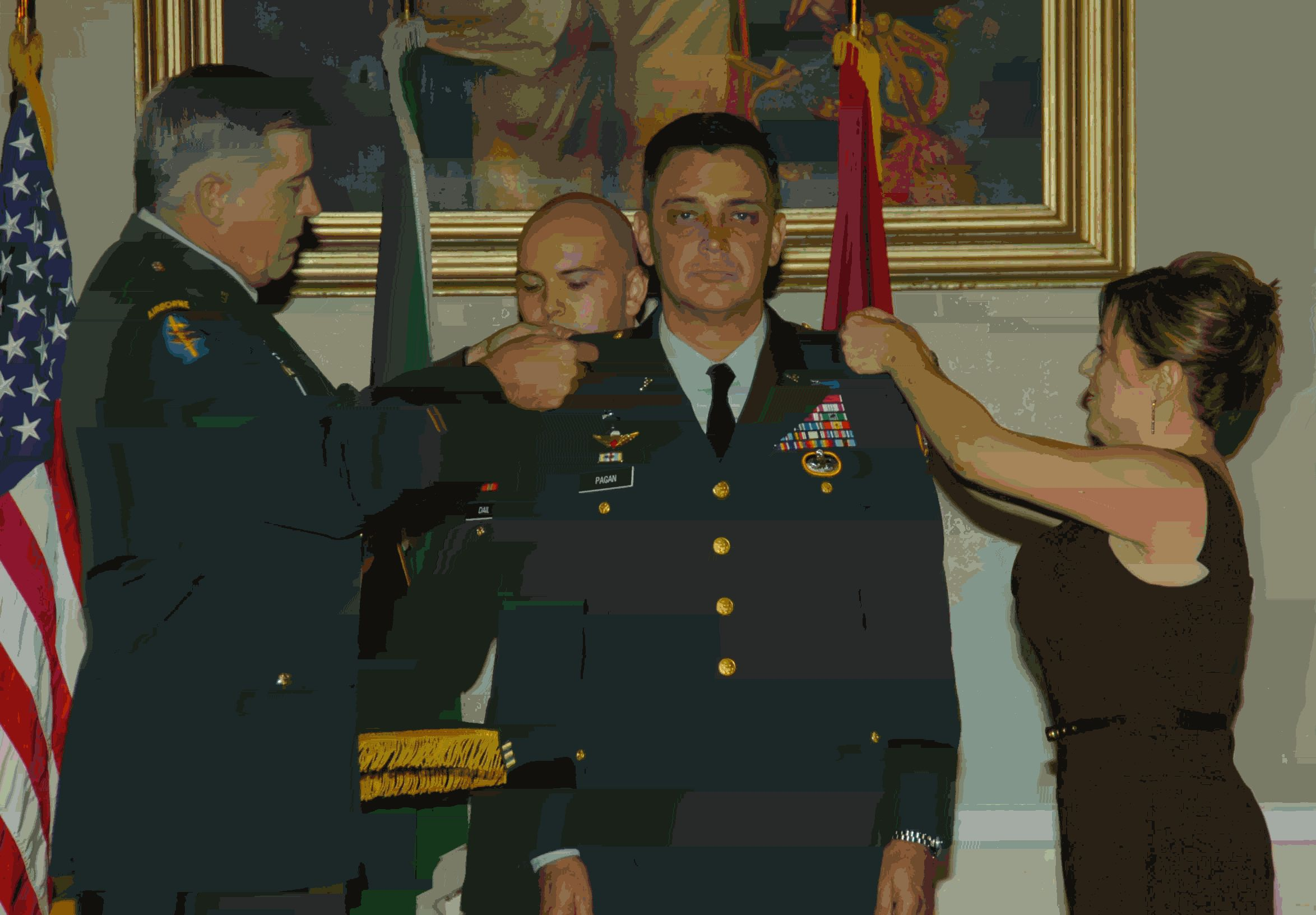
Major General James Parker and Elizabeth Pagan pinned the stars on Pagan's shoulders

On September 27, 2007, Pagan was promoted to Brigadier General at a ceremony held at the Fort Bragg Officers Club. Major General James Parker, the commander of the John F. Kennedy Special Warfare Center and School and Pagan's wife, Elizabeth, pinned the stars on his shoulders. Also present were ROTC classmates, a friend from Chile, family members from Puerto Rico and a South Korean brigadier general and Admiral Eric T. Olson, commander of U.S. Special Operations Command at MacDill Air Force Base in Tampa, Florida. Pagan was quoted as saying:

I am grateful to a nation, an Army, that allows a guy like me to be a general officer one day", Pagan said. "I am grateful for the great soldiers I have served with during the years I have been in the Army, mostly in Special Forces, exceptional men, like the ones we've lost in Iraq where we served with 5th Special Forces Group. I carry their memories with me every day of my life.

=== Special Operations Command South ===
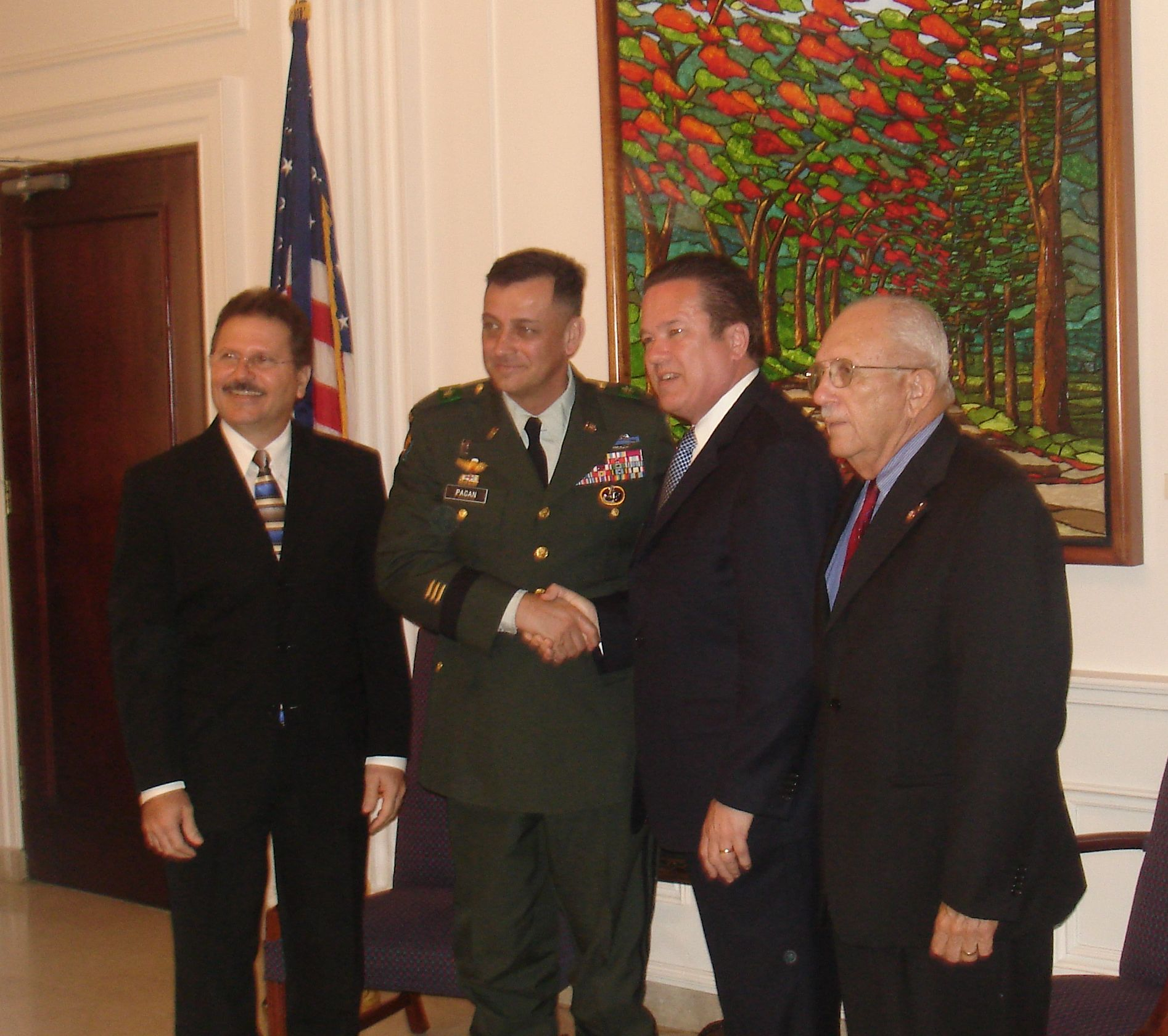
BG Pagan with members of the Puerto Rican Government on Memorial Day 2008

In 2008, Pagan was selected to head U.S. Special Operations Forces throughout Latin America and the Caribbean as commander of Special Operations Command South (SOCSOUTH) at Homestead Air Reserve Base, Florida. Pagan made history yet again as the first commanding officer of Puerto Rican descent to command SOCSOUTH. The command is a subordinate, unified command of U.S. Southern Command, which is based in Doral and oversees U.S. military Special Operations in the region.

Special Operations Command South oversees Special Forces, Civil Affairs, Public Affairs and Psychological Operations missions throughout Latin America and the Caribbean. The command manages more than 200 special operations deployments per year with an average of 42 missions in 26 countries at any given time.

Pagan retired from the Army after a Change Of Command ceremony held 17 September 2010 between himself and RDML Thomas Brown. His career spanned over 30 years.

== Military Training ==
Pagan is a graduate of the Infantry Officer Basic and Advanced Courses, the Combined Arms and Services Staff School, the Special Forces Detachment Officer Qualification Course, the Army Command and General Staff Course, the Joint Forces Staff College and the Army War College.

== Personal ==
The Pagans have a daughter, Karla, a son, Hector, and a niece, Maria, who lives with them. Pagan and his wife became grandparents in 2007. He earned a master's degree in management from Troy State University and a master's degree in strategic studies from the U.S. Army War College.

In 2017 Hector E. Pagan was inducted to the Puerto Rico Veterans Hall of Fame.

== Military awards and decorations ==
Among Pagan's military awards and decorations are the following:

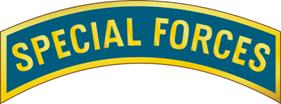
Combat Infantryman Badge (2nd award)
Expert Infantryman Badge
Master Parachutists Badge
Special Forces Tab
Ranger Tab
1st Special Forces Command (Airborne) Distinctive Unit Insignia
Overseas Service Bars (3)

Defense Superior Service Medal with (second award)
Legion of Merit
Bronze Star Medal (with 1 bronze oak leaf cluster)
Defense Meritorious Service Medal
Meritorious Service Medal (with silver and bronze oak leaf clusters)
Army Commendation Medal (with bronze oak leaf cluster)
Army Achievement Medal (with bronze oak leaf cluster)
Joint Service Achievement Medal
National Defense Service Medal (with one bronze service star)
Armed Forces Expeditionary Medal (with one bronze service star)
Joint Meritorious Unit Award (with 2 bronze oak leaf clusters)
Navy Meritorious Unit Commendation
Iraq Campaign Medal
Global War on Terrorism Expeditionary Medal
Global War on Terrorism Service Medal
Army Service Ribbon
Army Overseas Service Ribbon (with award numeral 1)

== See also ==
- List of Puerto Ricans
- List of Puerto Rican military personnel
