= Iván Castro =

Blind officer in the United States Army Rangers

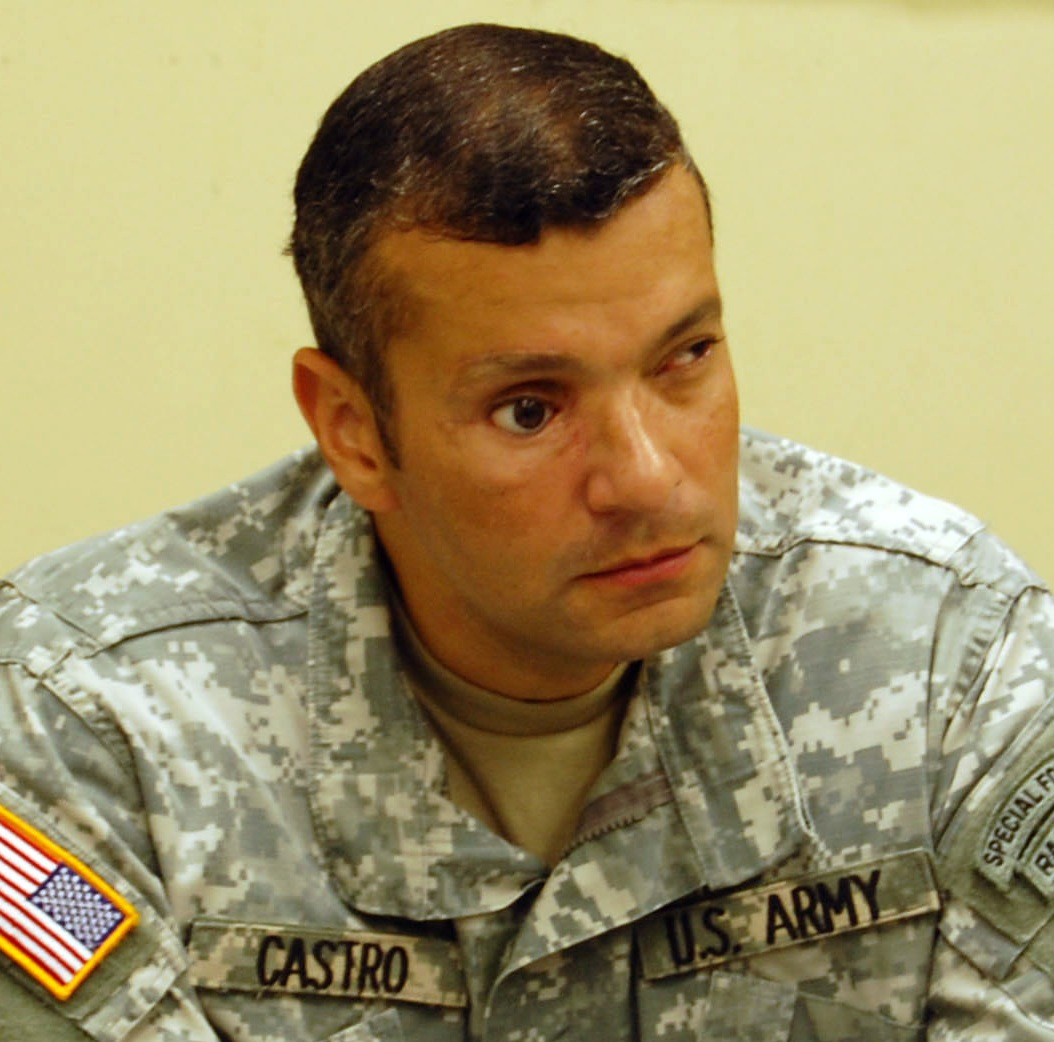
- Captain Iván Castro
- Born: 1967 (age 58–59); Hoboken, New Jersey
- Military career
- Allegiance: United States of America
- Branch: United States Army
- Service years: 1987 – 2017
- Rank: Major
- Unit: Special Operations Recruiting Battalion (SORB) - Assistant Operations Officer
- Conflicts: Operations Desert Storm/Shield; Operation Iraqi Freedom; Operation Enduring Freedom; Operation Joint Forge; Campaigns in Kosovo and Albania
- Awards: Purple Heart; Meritorious Service Medal; Army Commendation Medal

Iván Castro (born 1967) is a former United States Army officer who continued serving on active duty in the Special Forces despite losing his eyesight. He was one of three blind active duty officers who served in the U.S. Army and the only blind officer serving in the United States Army Special Forces. Castro served at the Special Operations Recruiting Battalion as the Assistant Operations Officer/Total Army Involvement Recruiting Coordinator before his retirement in 2017. He is an advocate of rehabilitation, employment and education for those wounded in combat and participates in various races and marathons as a contestant.

== Early years ==
Castro was born in Hoboken, New Jersey to parents who were originally from Puerto Rico. In 1979, when he was 12 years old, he moved to Puerto Rico with his mother. After graduating from Antilles Military Academy in Trujillo Alto, Puerto Rico, Castro attended the University of Puerto Rico on an athletic scholarship. During his student years he represented his alma mater in track and field and cross country competitions. After four years of college, Castro enlisted in the US Army as a Private First Class and reached the rank of Sergeant First Class before attending Officer Candidate School. Castro later earned his BBA from Campbell University in North Carolina.

== Military career ==
Castro's military career began in the summer of 1987. He attended the Basic Airborne Course while enrolled in the ROTC program at the University of Puerto Rico. Castro also served as an infantryman in the Puerto Rico Army National Guard from 1988 to 1990. He then transferred to the active component of the U.S. Army, completing his first tour of duty in Co B, 1st Battalion, 87th Infantry. During this time, he was deployed in support of Operation Desert Storm/Desert Shield. Upon his return, he served with 101st Pathfinder Detachment at Fort Campbell, Kentucky.

In 1992, Castro was reassigned to Co E, (Long Range Surveillance), 51st Infantry in Darmstadt, Germany. While in Germany, Castro deployed twice to Bosnia in support of Operations Joint Endeavor and Joint Forge. In 1996, he reported to Co C, 3d Battalion, 75th Ranger Regiment and in 1998, Castro served as a drill sergeant at Co A, 2d Battalion, 19th Infantry at Sand Hill at Fort Benning, Georgia.

In 1999, he attended Special Forces Assessment and Selection and later that year began the Special Forces Qualification Course. Upon graduation in 2000, he reported to Co B, 3d Battalion, 7th Special Forces Group (Airborne) at Fort Bragg, North Carolina. Castro's MOS was Special Forces Weapons Sergeant. While there, he deployed to Colombia, Belize, and Ecuador.

Castro went to night school to complete a B.A. degree, before attending the Army's Officers Candidate School. He attended Officer Candidate School in 2004, earning a second lieutenant commission the same year. He then attended the Infantry Officer basic course at Fort Benning, GA. In 2005, he reported to Co D, 1st Battalion (Airborne), 325th Infantry Regiment, 82d Airborne Division at Fort Bragg, NC. While assigned to the 82d, he deployed to Afghanistan in support of Operation Enduring Freedom for the first parliamentary elections.

=== Deployment to Iraq ===
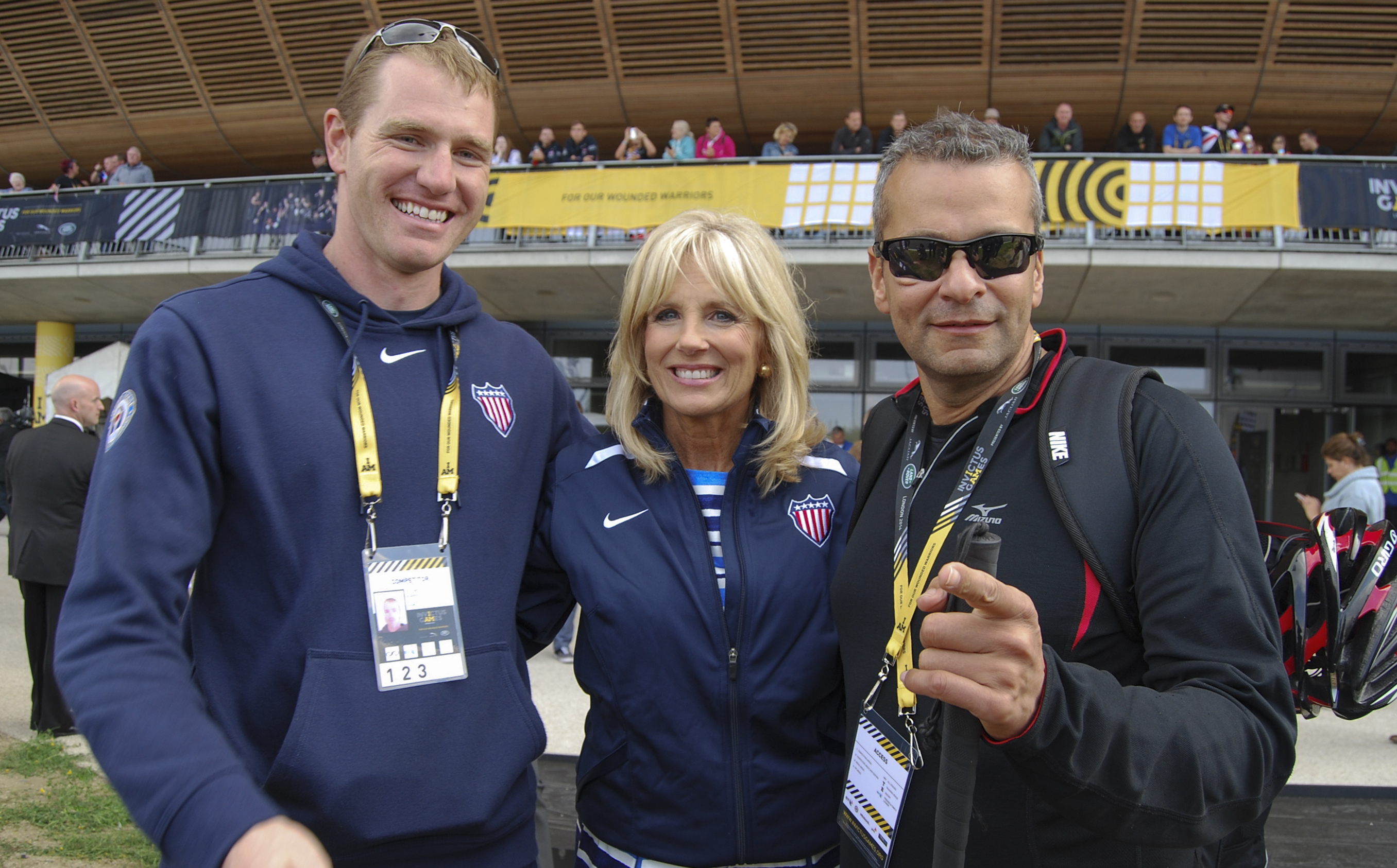
Jill Biden joins U.S. Army Capt. Iván Castro (right) and his guide Richard Kirby (left), 2014

By the time he was sent to Iraq as a scout platoon leader with the 1st Battalion (Airborne), 325th Infantry Regiment, Castro was already an experienced combat veteran. In 2006, Castro was assigned to the 1st Battalion (Airborne), 325th Infantry Regiment, 82d Airborne Division, which was in combat in Iraq at the time. In September 2006, Castro and his men had relieved other paratroopers atop a house in the town of Yusifiyah, some 20 miles southwest of Baghdad, after a night of fighting.

As an officer, Castro was not required to personally provide fire support to fellow soldiers in the exposed housetop position. Nonetheless, he volunteered for the mission and was accompanied by Sergeant Ralph Porras and Private First Class Justin Dreese. A mortar round landed a few feet away from him, killing Sergeant Porras and PFC Dreese and severely wounding Castro. Shrapnel tore through his body, damaging a shoulder, breaking an arm, fracturing facial bones and collapsing his lungs. The blast also drove the frame of his protective eyewear into his face.

Castro was sent to the National Naval Medical Center in Bethesda, Maryland. The top half of his right index finger was ripped off and the doctors had to amputate the remaining part of the finger. His right eye was blown out and he had a metal fragment in his left eye. The extent of his injuries was such that doctors doubted whether Castro would survive the week. When Castro regained consciousness days later, his right eye was gone, but doctors hoped to salvage the vision in his left. The surgeons later removed one last piece of shrapnel from that eye. When they took off his bandages they flashed a light for Castro to see; however, when he did not respond to the light, he was told that he would never see again. Castro remained in the hospital for two months after his injury, with no idea of what he would do next. He then overheard a doctor and a nurse discussing the next Army Ten-Miler and the Marine Corps Marathon. He asked his doctor if the courses were flat or hilly, then made running both races his goal.

=== Recovery ===
Castro spent 17 months in recovery before seeking a permanent assignment in the Army's Special Operations Command, at the 7th Special Forces Group's headquarters company in Fort Bragg. Through convalescence and rehabilitation, Castro struggled to regain a measure of independence and regularly worked out – both running and in the gym.

=== New assignment ===
Before being appointed executive officer of the 7th Special Forces Group's headquarters company, he spent a weekend familiarizing himself with the group area where he was going to work by walking around and measuring the steps from his car to his office. He is quoted in the media as saying:

"I am going to push the limits," "I don't want to go to Fort Bragg and show up and sit in an office. I want to work every day and have a mission." "I want to be treated the same way as other officers," Castro said. "I don't want them to take pity over me or give me something I've not earned."

Upon his appointment, Castro became the only blind officer serving in the Special Forces and one of three blind officers who serve in the active-duty Army, though his managerial tasks are not directly involved with combat. In February 2008, Castro was promoted to the rank of captain, and served as the executive officer of the 7th Special Forces Group at Fort Bragg.

On December 15, 2009, Castro graduated from the Maneuver Captains Career Course at Fort Benning, Georgia as the program's first blind graduate. He then began working as the Assistant Operations Officer/Total Army Involvement Recruiting Coordinator at Fort Bragg, N.C. He retired from the military in 2017 after 28 years of service.

== Athletic endeavors ==
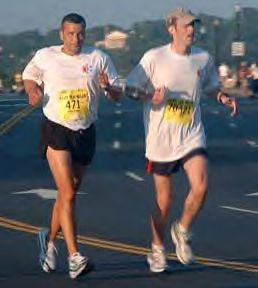
Capt. Iván Castro (#471) guided by Major Phil Young (#70321) runs the Army Ten-Miler.

Castro has remained active as an athlete. As of 2017, Castro has completed over 50 marathons. At Bragg he trained with Major Phil Young, who was his team leader in the Special Forces, and has participated in several long-distance road races, often being enthusiastically greeted by the audiences for his determination. He now trains with Lieutenant Colonel Fred Dummar, who is his battalion commander. Together, they have completed several marathons. Among the notable races and marathons in which Castro has participated, with a guide, as a member of the "Missing Parts In Action" team in 2007, are the Army Ten-Miler and the Marine Corps Marathon. In 2008, he participated in the Bataan Memorial Death March Marathon in New Mexico, the Boston Marathon and the U.S. Air Force Marathon.

In 2008, Castro as a member and participant in Operation Peer Support, participated in the Blinded Veterans Association's 62nd National Convention. In June 2009, Castro participated in the Midnight Boogie 50 mile ultramarathon.

In 2014, he visited the South Pole with other wounded veterans and soldiers from the United States and Britain after intense hiking and skiing training.

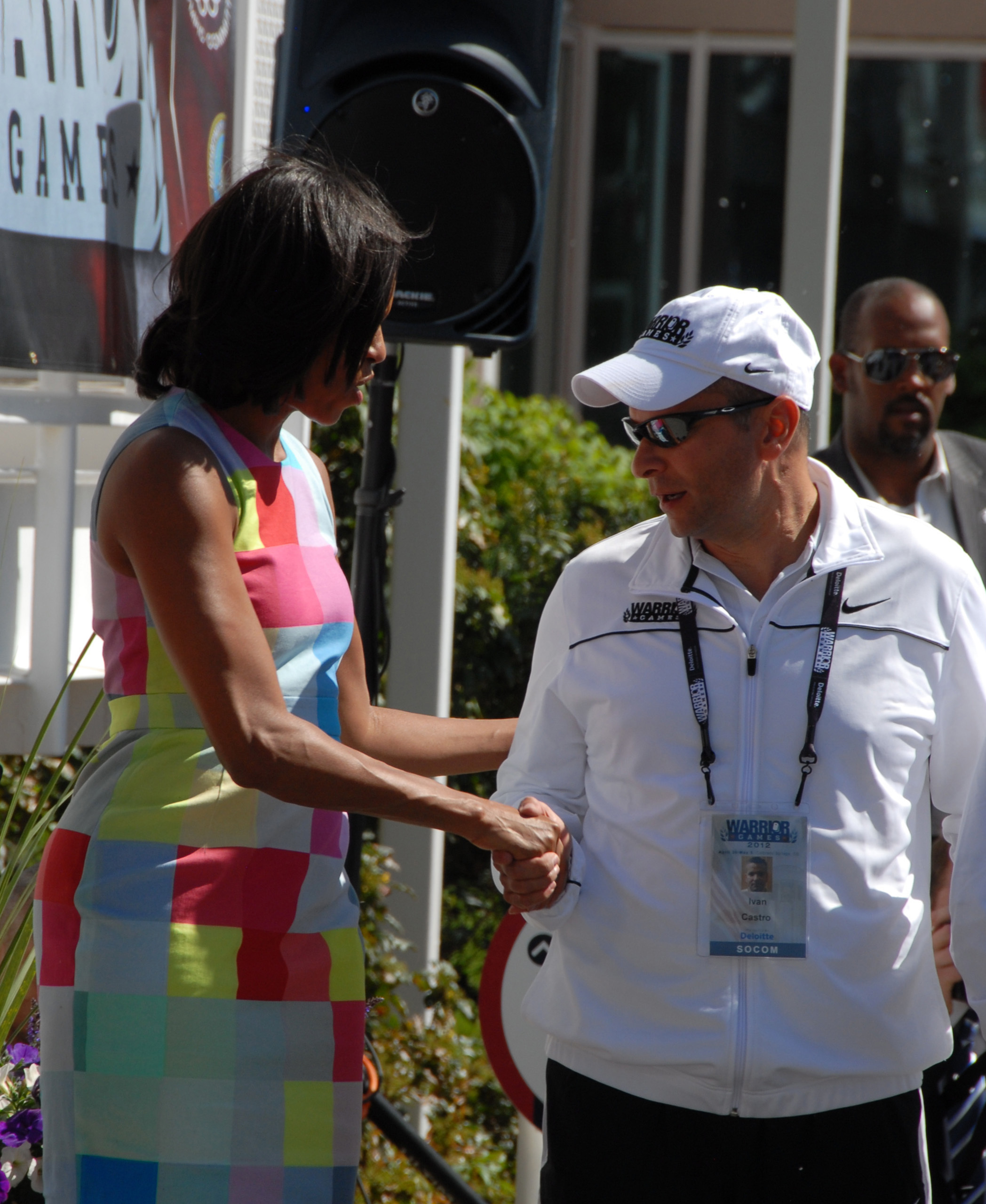
First Lady Michelle Obama shaking Castro's hand during the opening ceremony of the 2012 Warrior Games.

In 2017, Castro and another disabled veteran, Karl Hinett, ran the Boston Marathon and six days later the London Marathon to support Heads Together, a British mental health initiative.

== Community service ==
Castro is an advocate of rehabilitation funding for the blind, visiting members of Congress in his quest. He was honored during a visit to the Charlie Norwood VA Medical Center in Augusta, Georgia with a plaque engraved in braille, which thanked him for his continued service. He also mentors, coaches, and counsels wounded service members with various injuries. Castro was invited to be the keynote speaker at the 25th International Technology and Persons with Disabilities Conference.

== Writing ==
Castro co-authored a memoir about his life and experiences in 2016 called Fighting Blind.

== Personal life ==
Castro has one son. In 2018 Iván Castro was inducted to the Puerto Rico Veterans Hall of Fame.

== Awards and decorations ==
Among Castro's military decorations are the following:

Medals and Awards

- Purple Heart
- Meritorious Service Medal
- Army Commendation Medal
- Joint Service Achievement Medal
- Army Achievement Medal
- Valorous Unit Award
- Meritorious Unit Commendation
- Superior Unit Award
- Army Good Conduct Medal
- National Defense Service Medal
- Armed Forces Expeditionary Medal
- Southwest Asia Service Medal
- Kosovo Campaign Medal
- Afghanistan Campaign Medal
- Iraq Campaign Medal
- Global War on Terrorism Service Medal
- Armed Forces Service Medal
- NCO Professional Development Ribbon
- Army Service Ribbon
- Army Overseas Service Ribbon
- NATO Medal
- Kuwait Liberation Medal (Saudi Arabia)
- Kuwait Liberation Medal (Kuwait)

Badges

- Combat Infantryman Badge with Star
- Expert Infantryman Badge
- Master parachutist badge
- Military Freefall Parachutist Badge
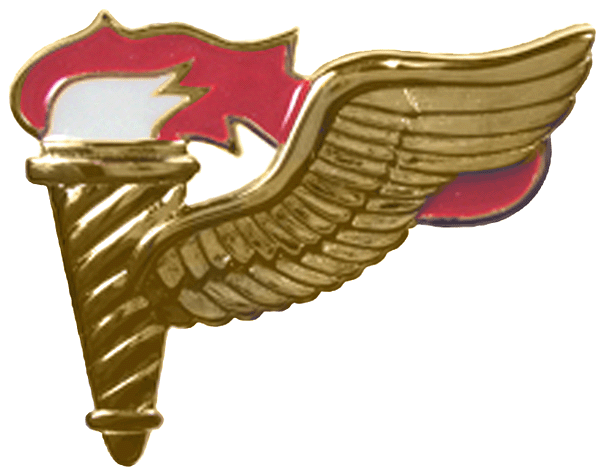
- Pathfinder Badge
- Air Assault Badge
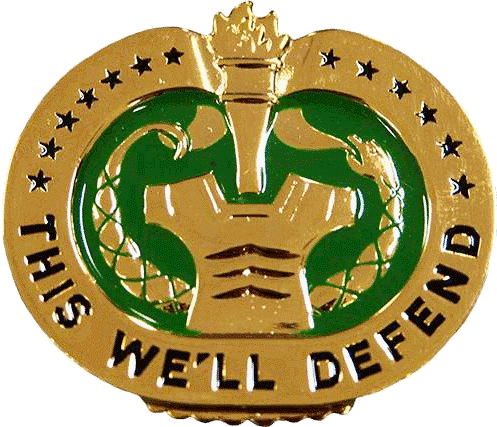
- Drill Sergeant Identification Badge

Foreign badges

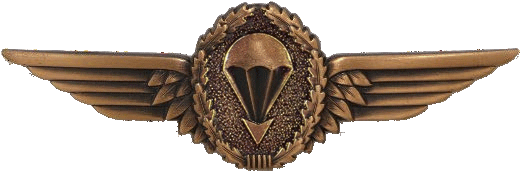
- German Parachutist Badge
- Canadian Parachutist Wings
- Dutch Parachutist Badge
- Colombian Jumpmaster Badge

Tabs

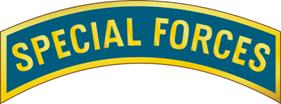
- Special Forces Tab
- Ranger tab
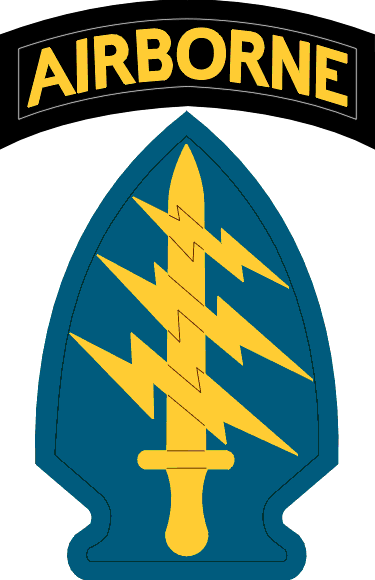
- Army Special Forces Combat Service Identification Badge
- Army Special Forces Distinctive Unit Insignia

== See also ==
- List of Puerto Ricans
- List of Puerto Rican military personnel
- Army Wounded Warrior Program
