= María Inés Ortiz =

United States Army officer

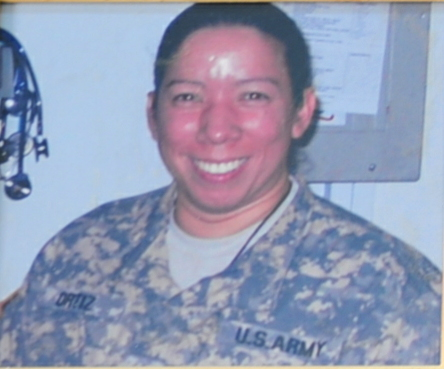
- Captain María Inés Ortiz; First U.S. Army nurse to die in combat since the Vietnam War.
- Born: April 24, 1967; Camden, New Jersey
- Died: July 10, 2007 (aged 40); Baghdad, Iraq
- Burial place: Arlington National Cemetery
- Military career
- Allegiance: United States
- Branch: United States Army Reserve; United States Army
- Service years: 1991–2007
- Rank: Captain
- Unit: Kirk U.S. Army Health Clinic
- Commands: Chief Nurse of General Medicine
- Conflicts: Iraq War †
- Awards: Bronze Star; Purple Heart

Captain María Inés Ortiz (April 24, 1967 – July 10, 2007) was the first American nurse to die in combat during Operation Iraqi Freedom and the first U.S. Army nurse to die in combat since the Vietnam War. The United States Army named the Forward Operating Base Prosperity clinic after her.

== Early years ==
Ortiz's parents, Jorge Ortiz and Iris Santiago, moved from Puerto Rico to Camden, New Jersey, where Ortiz was born. Her parents moved back to the island when she was a child and settled in the city of Bayamón where she received her primary and secondary education graduating from Dr. Agustin Stahl High School in Bayamón. In 1991, Ortiz enlisted in the United States Army Reserve in Puerto Rico. In 1993 she transferred to active duty that included service at Soto Cano Air Base in Honduras, South Korea and the Walter Reed Army Hospital in Washington, D.C.

== Army nurse ==
Ortiz became interested in nursing and pursued her objective of becoming a registered nurse by continuing her academic education at the University of Puerto Rico, Medical Sciences Campus. She earned her degree in nursing and commissioned as an officer in 1999. In 2004, Ortiz earned her master's degree in quality management from the Massachusetts National Graduate School. Ortiz was assigned to Kirk U.S. Army Health Clinic at the Aberdeen Proving Ground in Maryland, where she was chief nurse of general medicine.

In September 2006, she was reassigned to the 28th Combat Support Hospital, 3rd Medical Command in an area known as the "Green Zone" in Baghdad, Iraq. The Green Zone is a fortified district that also hosts the U.S. Embassy and Iraq's Parliament. That area had been the target of a series of recent attacks which had added to safety concerns for key Iraqi and international officials who live and work there.

On July 10, 2007, the Green Zone area came under a heavy mortar attack. Ortiz, who was not wearing body armor at the time of the attack and was returning to the hospital after a gym workout, was mortally wounded. She was the only U.S. citizen among three people killed. According to Margaret Tippy, a spokeswoman for the United States Army Medical Command, as of July 13, 2007, 90 Army medical personnel had been killed in combat in Iraq and Afghanistan since 2001. Ortiz is the first Army nurse to perish.

== In memory ==
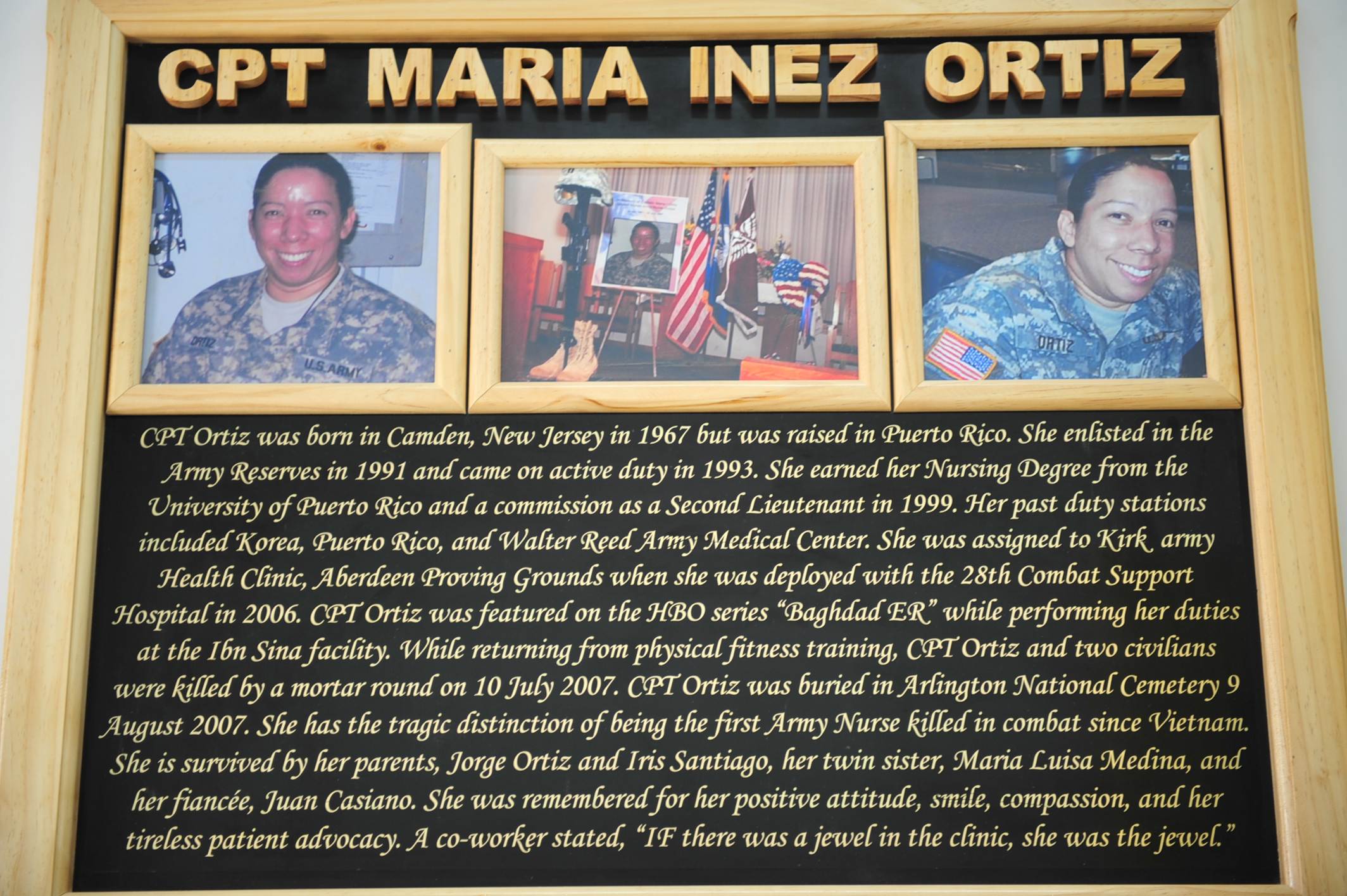
A plaque at the entrance of the Forward Operating Base Prosperity clinic honors the memory of Capt. Maria Ortiz.

Captain Ortiz is survived by her parents, four sisters and fiancé in New Jersey and Florida. A memorial service was held on Wednesday, July 18 at the Aberdeen Proving Ground chapel. She was buried with full honors at Arlington National Cemetery, in Arlington, Virginia. Her name was inscribed and unveiled by Puerto Rico Senate President Kenneth McClintock in "El Monumento de la Recordación", dedicated to Puerto Rico's fallen soldiers and which is located in San Juan, Puerto Rico on May 26, 2008 during the Memorial Day commemoration attended by President Bill Clinton, Senator Hillary Clinton and military historian Antonio Santiago. A plaque was placed at the entrance of the Forward Operating Base Prosperity clinic which was named after her, thus honoring the memory of Capt. Maria Ortiz.

== Awards and recognitions ==
Among Captain María Inés Ortiz's decorations and medals were the following:

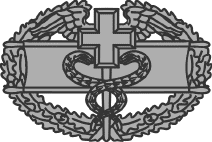

Badge	Combat Medical Badge		
1st Row	Bronze Star	Purple Heart	National Defense Service Medal
2nd Row	Iraq Campaign Medal	Global War on Terrorism Service Medal	Army Service Ribbon

== See also ==
- List of Puerto Ricans
- List of Puerto Rican military personnel
- History of women in Puerto Rico
