= Antonio Maldonado =

United States Air Force General

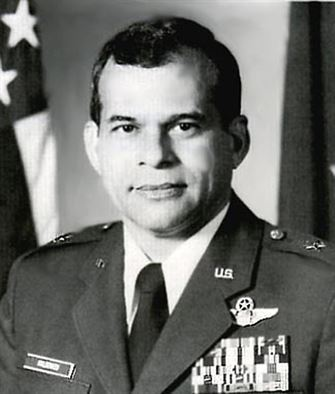
- Brigadier General Antonio Maldonado; Youngest pilot and Aircraft Commander of a B-52 Stratofortress nuclear bomber
- Born: 1941 (age 84–85); Comerío, Puerto Rico
- Military career
- Allegiance: United States of America
- Branch: Puerto Rico Air National Guard; United States Air Force
- Service years: Puerto Rico Air National Guard 1960-1964; United States Air Force (USAF) 1964-1991
- Rank: Brigadier General
- Nickname: "Tony"
- Units: 410th Bombardment Wing (Coveted Omaha Trophy), 34th Bomb Squadron, 60th Bombardment Squadron, 67th Tactical Fighter Wing, 432nd Tactical Reconnaissance Wing
- Conflicts: Vietnam War
- Awards: Defense Superior Service Medal; Legion of Merit; Distinguished Flying Cross; Meritorious Service Medal with three oak leaf clusters Air Medal with 10 oak leaf clusters Air Force Commendation Medal

Brigadier General Antonio Maldonado (born 1941) was an officer of the United States Air Force, who in 1967 became the youngest pilot and Aircraft Commander of a B-52 Stratofortress nuclear bomber. He served as Chief, U.S. Office of Defense Cooperation, Madrid, Spain. He was the senior Department of Defense representative to Spain and senior advisor to the US Ambassador to Spain. During the Persian Gulf War in 1991 he coordinated the overall US offensive operations from Spain.

== Early years ==
Maldonado was born in Comerío, a town located in the center-eastern region of Puerto Rico. He is the youngest of twelve brothers and sisters born to Flor Maldonado Colón from Barranquitas and Carmen López Rodriguez from Naranjito. His family moved to the capital of the island, San Juan and there he attended Central High School. Maldonado graduated from high school in May 1959 and continued his academic education in the University of Puerto Rico where he earned a Bachelor of Arts degree in business administration in May 1964. Started his military career as an enlisted Operation Specialist with the 198th TFS in the Puerto Rico Air National Guard at Muñiz Air National Guard Base while he was still a student at the University of Puerto Rico during the early 60s. Upon his graduation, Maldonado received the commission of Second Lieutenant in the United States Air Force as a Distinguished Graduate from the Air Force Reserve Officer Training Corps program. He married Carmen Gonzalez from San Juan, Puerto Rico.

== Military career ==
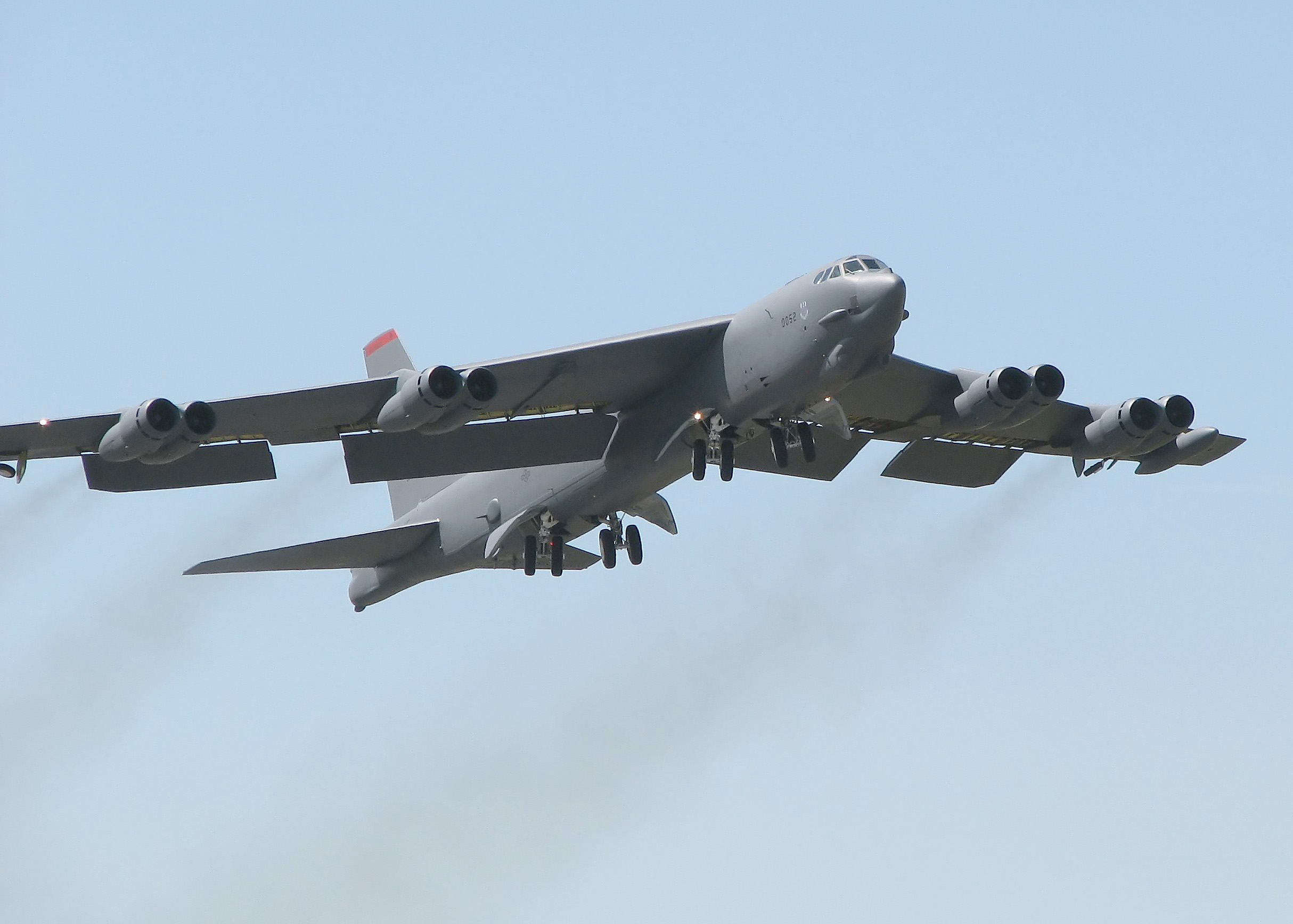
B-52 - Type of aircraft flown by Maldonado

Maldonado was sent to Moody Air Force Base in Georgia where he completed his Air Force pilot training in August 1965. He was then assigned as a B-52 pilot with the 34th Bomb Squadron at Wright-Patterson Air Force Base in Ohio and in January 1969 became the youngest person to become an Aircraft Commander in said aircraft with the 60th Bombardment Squadron at Ramey Air Force Base in Puerto Rico. During his tour at Ramey he earned his Master of Business Administration degree at the Interamerican University of Puerto Rico in May 1969. In 1970, he was assigned to the 67th Tactical Fighter Wing at Mountain Home Air Force Base in Idaho, where he trained as an RF-4C Phantom pilot.

== Vietnam War ==
In January 1971, Maldonado was transferred to the 432nd Tactical Fighter Reconnaissance Wing, Udon Royal Thai Air Force Base in Thailand. His active participation in the Vietnam War included 183 air combat missions over North and South Vietnam, Laos and Cambodia logging more than 400 combat flying hours in the RF-4C Phantom.

== Return to the United States ==
In December 1971, Maldonado returned to the United States upon completing his tour of duty in Vietnam. He was assigned to Bergstrom Air Force Base in Texas, as an RF-4C Instructor Pilot. In December 1972 he was selected for a special assignment as an International Politico-military Affairs Officer to the United States Air Forces Southern Command/U.S. Air Force Southern Air Division, Albrook Air Force Base in the Panama Canal Zone. Maldonado left Panama to attend the Army Command and General Staff College from July 1976 to July 1977.

Among the assignments which he held from 1977 to 1982 were the following: B-52 Instructor Pilot and Chief of the Command Control Division (1977–1979) for the 42nd Bombardment Wing at Loring Air Force Base, Maine; Commander of the 28th Bombardment Squadron and later Assistant Deputy Commander for Operations, 19th Bombardment Wing at Robins Air Force Base, Georgia (1979–1981). He continued his military academic education by attending the Air War College at Maxwell Air Force Base in Alabama graduating in May 1982 as a Distinguished Graduate.

== Pentagon assignments ==
Upon his graduation from the Air War College, Maldonado was assigned to Headquarters, United States Air Force at the Pentagon in Washington, D.C., as Chief, Western Hemisphere Division, Office of the Deputy Director for Plans and Policy. In June 1983 he was named Chief, Strategic Offensive Forces Division, Directorate of Plans.

In April 1984, Maldonado was transferred to K.I. Sawyer Air Force Base in Michigan. During the years which he spent there (1984–1987) he assumed various leadership positions: Deputy Commander for Operations (1984), 410th Bombardment Wing; Vice Commander (September 1984)and Commander (July 1985). While commanding the 410th, General Maldonado won numerous top Air Force awards including the coveted Omaha Trophy (best combat Wing) and the 390th Bombardment Group Memorial Trophy (best Wing Commander).

In May 1987, Maldonado was reassigned once more to the Pentagon where he served as Chief, Strategic Operations Division, Operations Directorate, Office of the Joint Chiefs of Staff. In June 1988 he became Deputy Director for Operations, National Military Command Center, the Pentagon. On September 1 of that same year, he was promoted to the rank of Brigadier General becoming the second Air Force Officer from Puerto Rico and the first from a Puerto Rico University to reach the general officer ranks.

In July 1989, Maldonado was named Chief, U.S. Office of Defense Cooperation, Madrid, Spain, becoming the senior Department of Defense representative to that country. His responsibilities included providing overall direction to U.S. elements in Spain on status of forces, security assistance programs and other defense and base agreement matters. He also provided overall coordination for US offensive operations out of Spain during the 1991 Persian Gulf War. Brigadier General Maldonado retired from the United States Air Force on September 1, 1991, with more than 4,000 hours of flight, after 27 years of service of active duty service.

== Later years ==
After Maldonado retired from the United States Air Force in 1991, he was named President of "Fomento Industrial de Puerto Rico" (Puerto Rico Industrial Development Company) by the Government of Puerto Rico, a position which he held until January 1993. In 1993 he became the CEO of the American Red Cross, Puerto Rico Region. In 1999 he became Executive Director of Palmas Del Mar Homeowners Association, in Humacao, Puerto Rico. Maldonado is a board member of the US National Marrow Donor Program and a member of the Board of Governors PR Aqueducts Authority. Maldonado is married to Ilia Lopez from Humacao, Puerto Rico, and has four daughters Carmen Zaydee, Joyce, Suzy and Elsie Oshiry and grandchildren Calvin, Isabella, Gabriella, Allegra, Spencer and Antonio.

In 2017 Antonio Maldonado was inducted to the Puerto Rico Veterans Hall of Fame.

in 2024 Maldonado authored and published his autobiography, The Sky Is Not the Limit, chronicling his journey from Puerto Rico to becoming a pioneering Air Force general.

== Awards and recognitions ==
Among Brigadier General Antonio Maldonado's decorations and medals were the following:

Command Pilot Badge
Joint Chiefs of Staff Identification Badge

Defense Superior Service Medal
Legion of Merit
Distinguished Flying Cross
Meritorious Service Medal with three bronze oak leaf clusters
Air Medal with one silver and three oak leaf clusters (Tenth award)
Air Force Commendation Medal
Air Force Longevity Service Award
National Defense Service Medal with one bronze service star
Air Force Overseas Short Tour Service Ribbon
Armed Forces Expeditionary Medal with bronze service star
Vietnam Service Medal with one bronze service star
Small Arms Expert Marksmanship Ribbon
Air Force Training Ribbon
Vietnam Gallantry Cross with Emblem with Palm and Frame
Vietnam Civil Actions Medal
Vietnam Campaign Medal
Inter-American Defense Board Medal

== See also ==
- List of Puerto Ricans
- List of Puerto Rican military personnel
- Hispanics in the United States Air Force
