= Francisco J. Collazo =

Puerto Rican businessman (born 1931)

- Born: 1931 (age 94–95); Utuado, Puerto Rico
- Military career
- Allegiance: United States of America
- Branch: United States Army
- Service years: 1946–1976
- Rank: Chief Warrant Officer
- Conflicts: Korean War; Vietnam War
- Awards: Bronze Star Medal (with 1 Oak Leaf Cluster)

Francisco J. Collazo (born 1931) is the CEO and President of Collazo Enterprises Inc. He is the co-founder of COLSA Corporation, a business enterprise which provides engineering and support services to NASA, U.S. Army, U.S. Air Force, U.S. Navy, Defense Intelligence Agency, and the Missile Defense Agency. In 2012, COLSA Corp. was recognized by Hispanic Business Magazine as being one of the top 100 Hispanic Businesses in the United States.

== Early years ==
Collazo was born in the city of Utuado, Puerto Rico and grew up in his father's farm. He received his primary education in his hometown. In 1946, he dropped out of high school and joined the United States Army. He continued his education while serving in the military where he went to the Korean War and the Vietnam War and retired from the Army after 30 years of service with the rank of Chief Warrant Officer. Among his military decorations was the Meritorious Service Medal, Bronze Star Medal with an Oak Leaf Cluster and the Army Commendation Medal for his service during the Vietnam War. Mr. Collazo is a service-connected disabled veteran.

Collazo attended the University of Texas in Austin, Texas where he earned a bachelor's degree in Mathematics and Computer Science. He later earned a master of Computer Systems Engineering from the Southeastern Institute of Technology.

== COLSA Corporation ==
Collazo and his wife, whom he married in 1955, moved to Huntsville, Alabama. In 1980, they founded COLSA Corporation in the garage of their home. The principal idea behind the foundation of the new company was to provide systems analysis and engineering in support of air defense systems material development. By 1983, the company had 20 employees. That same year, the Government awarded COLSA its first prime contract.

The company moved from Collazo's garage to South Memorial Parkway in Huntsville and later to Sparkman Drive. The company is currently located in Cummings Research Park. In 1997, COLSA was awarded the Cogswell Award for Excellence in Security Operations. In 2003, COLSA acquired Huntsville-based Pace and Waite, Inc., and Digital Wizards, Inc. Among COLSA's clients are NASA, the U.S. Army, the U.S. Air Force, the U.S. Navy, the Defense Intelligence Agency and the Missile Defense Agency.

In 2004, COLSA corporation used 1,566 Xserve G5 servers clustered to create a new supercomputer MACH5 -- multiple advanced computers for hypersonics. Early estimates hoped it would be the second fastest supercomputer in the world at the time, faster than 2003 #3 System X . It reached #15 on the TOP500 list.

Under Collazo's leadership the company grew and continued to expand. The company has regional offices in Washington, DC; Orlando, Florida; Shalimar, Florida; San Diego, California, Colorado Springs, Colorado and Sierra Vista, Arizona.

== Collazo Enterprises, Inc. ==
On January 2, 1996, Collazo incorporated Collazo Enterprises the primary holding company that owns all stock in COLSA Corporation, COLSA International, FJC Growth Capital, and FCA Properties. In 2000, Collazo Enterprises, Inc. established the Francisco J. Collazo (COLSA) Scholarship at the University of Alabama. The scholarship is awarded to full-time students majoring in engineering, Science, Mathematics, or Technology and is based on academic merit, leadership potential, and contributions to school and community.

== Personal ==
Collazo retired from the United States Army in 1976 and lives together with his wife has three children and seven grandchildren, continues to reside in Huntsville. He continues to be the chairman of the board and chief executive officer of COLSA Corporation. In May 2003, he was awarded the honorary degree of Doctor of Science from the University of Alabama in Huntsville. On October 25, 2012, COLSA Corp. was recognized by Hispanic Business Magazine as being one of the top 100 Hispanic Businesses in the United States. In 2024, Collazo received the Lifetime Achievement Award from U.S. Rep. Dale Strong.

== Military awards and decorations ==
Among Collazo 's decorations are the following:

1st Row	Bronze Star Medal with one bronze oak leaf cluster		Meritorious Service Medal with two bronze oak leaf clusters
2nd Row	Army Commendation Medal with three bronze oak leaf clusters	National Defense Service Medal with one service star	Korean Service Medal
3rd Row	United Nations Service Medal Korea	Vietnam Service Medal with four service stars]	Vietnam Campaign Medal

== See also ==
- List of Puerto Ricans
