= Fernando E. Rodríguez Vargas =

Puerto Rican doctor and a Major in the U.S. Army

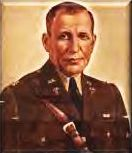
- Major Fernando E. Rodríguez Vargas; Discovered the bacteria which causes dental caries
- Born: February 24, 1888; Adjuntas, Puerto Rico
- Died: October 21, 1932 (aged 44); Washington, D.C.
- Burial place: Arlington National Cemetery
- Education: Georgetown University (BA, DDS)
- Military career
- Allegiance: United States of America
- Branch: United States Army
- Service years: 1917–1932
- Rank: Major
- Unit: Army Dental Corps

Fernando E. Rodríguez Vargas, (February 24, 1888 – October 21, 1932) was an odontologist (dentist), scientist and a Major in the U.S. Army who discovered the bacteria which causes dental caries.

== Early years ==
Fernando Emilio Rodríguez Vargas was born in Adjuntas, Puerto Rico to Luciano Rodriguez and Dolores Vargas. There he received both his primary education. Adjuntas did not have a high school until 1950, therefore he attended high school in the City of Ponce where the other students from Adjuntas went. After he graduated from high school, he applied and was accepted in the University of Puerto Rico where he took paramedic courses and earned his teachers certificate. He then went to work as a United States Internal Revenue Service inspector and later as a Spanish translator for the United States War Department. In 1910, Rodríguez Vargas applied and attended Georgetown University School of Dentistry, in Washington, D.C. where he earned his DDS degree in 1913. From 1913 to 1915, Rodríguez Vargas had his private practice in Washington, D.C. In 1915, he joined the United States Indian Medical Services, and was assigned to Tucson, Arizona located in the southwest region of the United States. During this time he studied the mottled enamel situation which was affecting Native Americans.

== Military service ==
On August 16, 1917, he joined the United States Army and on September 14, he was commissioned a first lieutenant. Rodríguez Vargas was assigned to the Army Dental Reserve Corps and attended a course at the Medical Officer's Training Camp at Camp Greenleaf, Georgia before being sent overseas.

The U.S. Congress had already declared war on Germany when Rodríguez Vargas was sent to the United Kingdom. In August 1919, he was reassigned to San Juan, Puerto Rico and served in Camp Las Casas. During his service in Puerto Rico he met and married Maria Anita Padilla. Rodríguez Vargas, who promoted to captain on September 8, and his wife had a son which they named Roberto.

== Scientific work ==
On February 18, 1921, Rodriguez Vargas was sent to Washington, D.C. and assigned to the Army Dental Corps where he continued his investigations in the field of bacteriology. Rodríguez Vargas was there as an educator and investigator of the bacteriological aspects of dental diseases. His research led him to discover the bacteria which causes dental caries. According to his investigations, three types of the Lactobacillus species, during the process of fermentation, are the causes of cavities. In December 1922, he published an original and fundamental work on the specific bacteriology of dental caries. His findings were published in the December issue of the Military Dental Journal titled "The Specific Study of the Bacteriology of Dental Cavities". Rodríguez Vargas also developed the techniques and methods of analysis. On September 28, 1928, Rodriguez Vargas published in the "Journal of the American Medical Association" his findings in the effectiveness of Iodine and other chemical agents as disinfectants of the mucous membranes of the mouth. Since then, other scientists have used the findings of his investigations as the basis in the study of the bacteriology of dental caries.

Rodríguez Vargas earned a Bachelor of Science degree from Georgetown University, in 1924 where he was an Associate Professor of Bacteriology in the School of Dentistry. On September 14, 1929, he was promoted to the rank of major.

== Later years ==
Rodríguez Vargas was a member of the District of Columbia Dental Society, the International Association of Dental Research and a fellow of the American College of Dentists. In 1925, he was assigned to the General Dispensary, U.S. Army in Boston, Massachusetts until August 1926, when he was reassigned to Holabird Quartermaster Depot, Baltimore, Maryland, which would turn out to be his last assignment.

Major Fernando E. Rodríguez Vargas became ill with pneumonia and was hospitalized at the Walter Reed Army Medical Center for treatment. On October 21, 1932, Rodríguez Vargas died of complications at the age of 44. He was buried at Arlington National Cemetery in Section 6 Site 8429. He was survived by his widow and son.

== Honors ==
On March 16, 1940, the American College of Dentists presented a plaque to the Army Medical Service Graduate School (now Walter Reed Army Institute of Research) in memory of Army dental officer Major Fernando E. Rodriguez for his pioneer research showing the relationship between the Lactobacillus acidophilus and dental caries.

On August 31, 1944, the War Department of the United States issued General Order No. 71 which renamed the Army General Hospital of Fort Brooke located in the former Ballajá Barracks (in the grounds of the Fort San Felipe del Morro) in Old San Juan, the Rodriguez (161st) General Hospital, in honor of Major Rodriguez Vargas.

On February 14, 1949, the Rodriguez General Hospital was closed as a part of the closing of Fort Brooke. The Outpatient Clinic located at Fort Buchanan, Puerto Rico was renamed; the Rodriguez Army Health Clinic (RACH) and remains in part to this day.

Rodríguez Vargas is the only Puerto Rican honored with a plaque and bust situated in front of the Walter Reed Army Institute of Research in Washington, D.C. In the 1950s, the Puerto Rico College of Dental Surgeons honored Rodriguez Vargas with the establishment of the "Dr. Fernando E. Rodriguez Scientific Contest".

== Military decoration ==
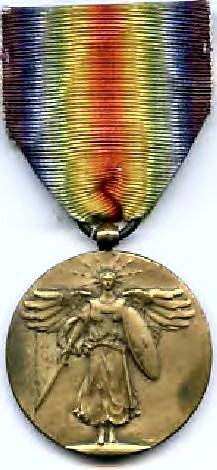
World War I Victory Medal

== See also ==
- List of Puerto Ricans
- List of Puerto Rican military personnel
- Puerto Rican scientists and inventors
- Puerto Ricans in World War I
