= Women's Army Corps Service Medal =

Women’s Army Corps Service Medal
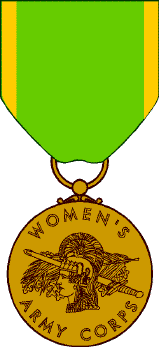
- Obverse
- Type: Military medal Service medal
- Awarded for: service in the Women's Army Corps and/or Women's Army Auxiliary Corps
- Presented by: Department of War
- Reverse
- Status: obsolete
- Established: Executive Order 9365, July 29, 1943
- First award: July 10, 1942
- Final award: September 2, 1945
- Service ribbon

Precedence
- Next (higher): American Defense Service Medal
- Next (lower): American Campaign Medal

The Women's Army Corps Service Medal was a military award of the United States Army which was created on July 29, 1943, by Executive Order 9365 issued by President Franklin Roosevelt. The medal was intended to recognize the service of women to the Army during the Second World War. The profile featured on the medal is that of the goddess Pallas Athena; the same profile was used for the Women's Army Corps branch insignia.

The Women's Army Corps Service Medal was awarded to any service member of the Women's Army Auxiliary Corps between July 10, 1942, and August 31, 1943, or the Women's Army Corps between September 1, 1943, and September 2, 1945. The medal was issued as a once-awarded medal, and there are no devices authorized for additional presentations. The medal ranked in order of precedence below the American Defense Service Medal and above the American Campaign Medal.

The Women's Army Corps Service Medal is considered obsolete as the United States Army is a combined service and no longer maintains any separate service corps for women, although it may still be worn by those who served.

== See also ==
- Awards and decorations of the United States military
