= José Ramirez Pantoja =

Puerto Rican politician

José R. Ramírez-Pantoja (February 1, 1919 – October 15, 1995) was a Puerto Rican politician who served in the House of Representatives of Puerto Rico in the mid-20th century. A veteran of the United States Army, he served as a Sergeant in the Pacific Theater of World War II. He is interred at the Puerto Rico National Cemetery in Bayamón, PR.
