= Edmund Ernest García =

United States admiral (1905–1971)

Edmund Ernest Garcia
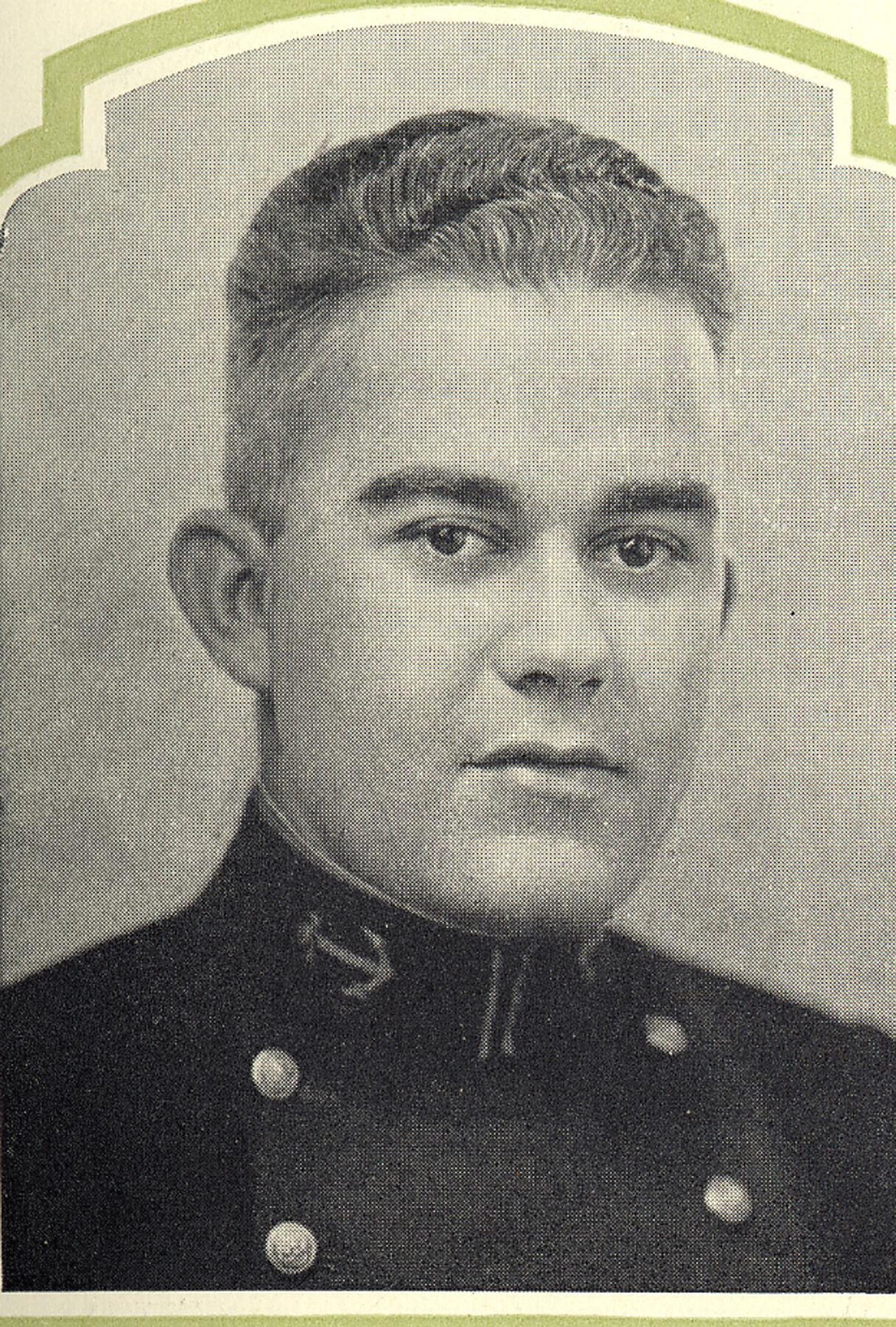
- Rear Admiral Edmund Ernest Garcia
- Born: March 25, 1905; San Juan, Puerto Rico
- Died: November 2, 1971 (aged 66); Ozona, Florida, U.S.
- Burial place: Arlington National Cemetery
- Military career
- Allegiance: United States of America
- Branch: United States Navy
- Service years: 1927-1968
- Rank: Rear Admiral
- Commands: USS Sloat
- Conflicts: World War II
- Awards: Bronze Star Medal with Combat "V"

Edmund Ernest Garcia (March 25, 1905 – November 2, 1971) was a Rear Admiral in the United States Navy who commanded the destroyer escort USS Sloat during World War II and participated in the invasions of North Africa, Sicily, and France.

== Early years ==
Garcia was born to Enrique García and Antonia Rumirez in San Juan, Puerto Rico, the capital city of the island. There he received both his primary and secondary education. Garcia was born into a family with a long tradition of military servitude. His father, Enrique Garcia, was a captain in the United States Army. In 1922, Garcia graduated from high school and received an appointment to the United States Naval Academy from Emmet Montgomery Reily, who served as appointed Governor of Puerto Rico from (1921–1923).

== Naval career ==
Garcia, was supposed to graduate from the academy in 1926, however he did not graduate and receive his commission of ensign until June 17, 1927, because of his academic deficiency in mathematics.

Garcia's first assignment was aboard USS Wyoming where he served as a gunnery officer from 1927 to 1928. He was later assigned to USS Galveston and in 1928 was trained as a naval aviator at Pensacola, Florida. Garcia received addition training in various military institutions which included the Torpedo School of San Diego, California.

From 1932 to 1939, of Garcia served in various ship's, among them USS New Mexico, USS Heron, USS Asheville and USS Tulsa. This was with the exception of the years 1935 to 1937, when he served as flight instructor at Naval Aviation School in Pensacola. In 1939, he was reassigned to Fort Mifflin, Pennsylvania, where he helped prepare and equip the aircraft carrier USS Hornet. He worked on various aircraft carriers until 1941, when the United States entered World War II.

== World War II ==
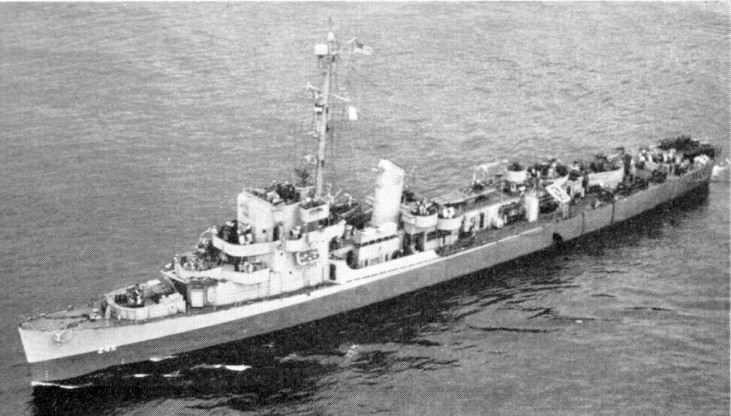
USS Sloat

In February 1942, Garcia assumed command of the minesweeper USS Cormorant at the Washington Navy Yard, in Washington, D.C. In June 1942 Cormorant was reclassified as a tugboat.

Between 18 January and 19 May 1943, Cormorant gave tug services at Guantánamo Bay to destroyers in training there, and entered the Charleston Navy Yard for repairs in June. Garcia was then transferred to serve as prospective commanding officer of the destroyer escort USS Sloat.

In June 1943 he reported to the Brown Shipbuilding Co. in Houston, Texas, where Sloat was being built. Sloat was an Edsall-class destroyer escort, which was launched on January 21, 1943, and commissioned on August 16, 1943, under the command of then Lieutenant Commander Garcia.

On November 11, Sloat, was assigned to the Escort Division (CortDiv) 7, and sailed out of New York Harbor with convoy UGS-24 bound for Norfolk and North Africa. The convoy arrived at Casablanca on December 2, and returned to New York on December 25, 1943.

On January 10, 1944, Sloat sailed to Casablanca and returned to New York on March. That same month Sloat joined a convoy, consisting of 72 merchant ships and 18 LSTs, which was guarded by Task Force (TF) 64. En route to Bizerte, Tunisia, the convoy was attacked by the Luftwaffe on April 1, approximately 56 miles (90 km) west of Algiers. Two planes were shot down and two damaged while only one ship in the convoy was damaged. The convoy arrived at Bizerte on April 3.

Eight days later, Sloat joined another convoy and returned to New York on May 1. García was awarded the Bronze Star Medal with Combat "V" for his actions. Part of the citation reads as follows:

"Meritorious achievement during operations against enemy forces while serving as Commander of a unit of ships of an escort group protecting trans-Atlantic Convoys during World War II...'

From June 15 to July 15, Sloat operated in the Caribbean Sea and Atlantic Ocean in search of German U-boats.

== Later years ==
From 1944 to 1945, Garcia served as commandant of the 58th Escort Division aboard USS Price. Upon his return to the United States after the war, Garcia served as commanding officer of the Naval Recruitment Station in New Orleans, Louisiana. After serving a short stint as commander of USS Whitley, Garcia was assigned as commanding officer of the naval base at Orange, Texas, and on May 20, 1954, he was given his last assignment before his retirement from the Navy, that of Commandant of the Sub Group 2, Charleston Group, in the Atlantic Fleet.

Garcia died November 2, 1971, in his home in Ozona, Florida. He was buried with full military honors in Arlington National Cemetery in Arlington, Arlington County, Virginia, USA.; plot: Sec: 4, Site: 2647-A W

== Decorations and awards ==
Rear Admiral Garcia's military awards include:

- Bronze Star with Combat "V"
- 2nd Nicaraguan Campaign Medal
- China Service Medal
- American Defense Service Medal
- American Campaign Medal
- European-African-Middle Eastern Campaign Medal with 3/16 star
- Asiatic-Pacific Campaign Medal with 3/16 star
- World War II Victory Medal
- Navy Occupation Service Medal (with Asia clasp)
- National Defense Service Medal

Badges:

- Naval Aviator Badge

== See also ==
- Hispanic Admirals in the United States Navy
- List of Puerto Ricans
- Puerto Ricans in World War II
- List of Puerto Rican military personnel
- Hispanics in the United States Naval Academy
- Hispanics in the United States Navy
