= Antonio Rodríguez Balinas =

United States Army general

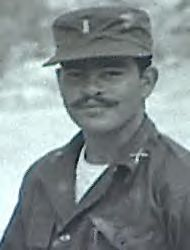
- Brigadier General Antonio Rodríguez Balinas; The first commander of the Office of the First U.S. Army Deputy Command
- Born: February 28, 1928; Adjuntas, Puerto Rico
- Died: September 21, 2011 (aged 83); Río Piedras, Puerto Rico
- Burial place: Puerto Rico National Cemetery in Bayamón, Puerto Rico
- Military career
- Allegiance: United States of America
- Branch: United States Army; United States Army Reserve
- Service years: 1948–1980
- Rank: Brigadier General
- Units: Company "F", 65th Infantry, 3d Infantry Division
- Commands: Office of the First United States Army Deputy Command, 166th Support Group
- Conflicts: Korean War
- Awards: Silver Star with Oak leaf cluster Legion of Merit; Purple Heart with Oak Leaf Cluster

Brigadier General Antonio Rodríguez Balinas (February 28, 1928 – September 21, 2011) was the first commander of the Office of the First United States Army Deputy Command.

== Early years ==
Rodríguez Balinas was born and raised in the town of Adjuntas, Puerto Rico, where he received his primary and secondary education.

He joined the United States Army upon graduating from the University of Puerto Rico, where he earned is Bachelor of Arts degree in Economics and a Doctorate in Law from University of Puerto Rico School of Law. Rodríguez Balinas entered the Officer Candidate School program and was commissioned a second lieutenant upon completing the program. At the outbreak of the Korean War, he was assigned to the 65th Infantry Regiment.

== Korean War ==
On April 23, 1951, Rodríguez Balinas, who was assigned to Company "F", 65th Infantry, 3d Infantry Division, defended the left flank of his company from constant enemy attacks at Ognyo-Bong, Hill 305 at a great risk to his life. He was awarded the Silver Star Medal and promoted to the rank of first lieutenant for his bravery. On December 23, 1951, he fearlessly walked through a lethal hail of enemy fire directly toward the hostile bunker of the enemy, hurled his hand grenades and singlehandedly completely destroyed the enemy position and its occupants near Sorgyon-Myon, Korea. For his actions he was awarded his second Silver Star and a Purple Heart.

== Later career ==
Rodríguez Balinas continued his academic education and earned a PhD degree in Law from the UPR. In March 1968, the reserve units in Puerto Rico and the U.S. Virgin Islands of the United States Army were organized into the 166th Support Group. On July 14, 1973, the then-Colonel Rodríguez Balinas took command of the 166th Support Group and was given full command and control of all USAR (United States Army Reserve) units in Puerto Rico and the U.S. Virgin Islands. One of Colonel Rodríguez Balinas's accomplishments was to have all the missions and functions of a major U.S. Army Reserve Command under the First Army. He wanted full autonomy for the Army Reserve forces in Puerto Rico.

In February 1977, the USAR Forces in Puerto Rico became a General Office Command with the establishment of the Office of the First U.S. Army Deputy Command with Antonio Rodríguez Balinas, who was promoted to the rank of brigadier general, as its first General Officer. In 1979, the USAR Forces in Puerto Rico were awarded the Best Major U.S. Army Reserve Command Award. Brigadier General Rodríguez Balinas held the position of General Officer until February 27, 1988, when he retired after 37 years of active and reserve duty. He was awarded the Legion of Merit Medal upon his retirement.

In 2018 Antonio Rodríguez Balinas was posthumously inducted to the Puerto Rico Veterans Hall of Fame.

== Death ==
He died on September 21, 2011, in Río Piedras, Puerto Rico, and was buried with military honors in the Puerto Rico National Cemetery located in the city of Bayamon.

== Military awards and decorations ==
Among Rodríguez Balinas' decorations were the following:

Combat Infantryman Badge
Silver Star with 1 bronze Oak Leaf Cluster	Legion of Merit	Purple Heart with 1 bronze Oak Leaf Cluster
Army Commendation Medal	Army Reserve Components Achievement Medal	National Defense Service Medal
Korean Service Medal with silver star	Armed Forces Reserve Medal with bronze Hourglass device	United Nations Korea Medal
Parachutist badge
Presidential Unit Citation		Republic of Korea Presidential Unit Citation

Foreign decoration

The Bravery Gold Medal of Greece was given by the government of Greece to the 65th Infantry Regiment and to the members of the regiment who fought in the Korean War.

- Chryssoun Aristion Andrias (Bravery Gold Medal of Greece)

Congressional Gold Medal

External videos
- You can see a video on YouTube of President Barack Obama awarding the Congressional Gold Medal to the Borinqueneers

On June 10, 2014, President Barack Obama, signed the legislation known as "The Borinqueneers CGM Bill" at an official ceremony. The Bill honors the 65th Infantry Regiment with the Congressional Gold Medal.

=== Silver Star citations ===
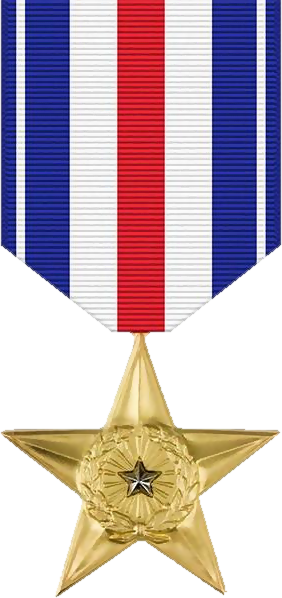

SILVER STAR

SECOND LIEUTENANT ANTONIO RODRIGUEZ BALINAS
HEADQUARTERS 3D INFANTRY DIVISION
GENERAL ORDERS # 278 - July 13, 1951
Citation:

SECOND LIEUTENANT ANTONIO RODRIGUEZ BALINAS, 01685780, Infantry, Company "F", 65th Infantry, 3d Infantry Division, United States Army. On April 23, 1951, while occupying defensive positions on Hill 305, in the vicinity of Ognyo-bong, Korea, Company "F" was subjected to a furious attack by an estimated 300 enemy. During the ensuing attack, Lieutenant RODRIGUEZ BALINAS, leader of the Second Platoon, continuously moved through withering hostile fire, encouraging and directing his men. Upon learning that the platoon's left flank was exposed, he personally went to the imperiled position to evaluate the situation and later returned with a squad to reinforce the weakened flank. Although the supply of ammunition was becoming critically low, he determinedly fought on until a re- supply of ammunition arrived. Lieutenant RODRIGUEZ BALINAS'S gallantry under fire inspired the members of his unit to contain the enemy attack and reflects the highest credit upon himself and the military service. Entered the military service from Puerto Rico.

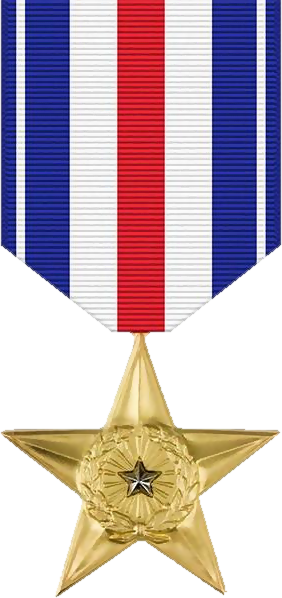

SILVER STAR

FIRST LIEUTENANT ANTONIO RODRIGUEZ BALINAS
HEADQUARTERS 3D INFANTRY DIVISION
GENERAL ORDERS # 197 - MAY 29, 1952
Citation:

First Lieutenant Antonio Rodriguez Balinas, # 01685780, Infantry, Company "F", 65th Infantry, 3d Infantry Division, United States Army. On December 23, 1951, Company "G", reinforced by the weapons platoon of Company "F", attacked heavily fortified hostile positions on Hill 200, near Sangyon-Myon, Korea. Lieutenant Rodriguez Balinas, platoon leader of the weapons platoon, attached himself to the assault platoon in order to direct close support fire from the mortars and 57 millimeter rifles of his platoon. After the supporting fire was lifted, he joined the assault platoon in its attack on the well entrenched enemy. Firing his carbine and throwing hand grenades, he effectively destroyed one hostile position. During the course of this vicious fighting, Lieutenant Rodriguez Balinas lost his carbine but, armed with only two hand grenades, he undauntedly charged another position manned by an enemy machine gun crew. He fearlessly walked through the lethal hail of fire directly toward the hostile bunker, hurled his hand grenades and completely destroyed the position and its occupants. Although painfully wounded in this action, he refused evacuation until the last of the wounded men had been removed to safety. Lieutenant Rodriguez Balinas' outstanding gallantry and inspirational leadership were instrumental in the success of the mission and reflect the highest credit upon himself and the military service. Entered the Federal Service from Puerto Rico.

== See also ==
- List of Puerto Ricans
- List of Puerto Rican military personnel
- 65th Infantry Regiment
- Borinqueneers Congressional Gold Medal
