= Agustín Ramos Calero =

Most decorated WWII Puerto Rican and Hispanic soldier in the US

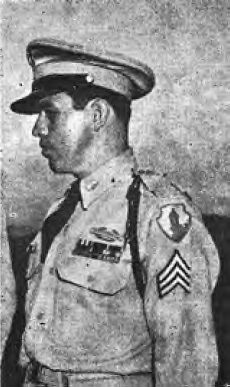
- SFC. Agustín Ramos Calero; Most decorated Hispanic in World War II
- Born: Agustín Ramos Calero; June 2, 1919; Isabela, Puerto Rico
- Died: February 10, 1989 (aged 69)
- Burial place: Puerto Rico National Cemetery in Bayamón, Puerto Rico
- Military career
- Allegiance: United States of America
- Branch: United States Army
- Service years: 1941–1962
- Rank: Sergeant First Class
- Nickname: One-Man Army
- Units: 65th Infantry Regiment, 3d Infantry Division
- Conflicts: World War II; Korean War
- Awards: Silver Star; Purple Heart (4); French Croix de Guerre

Sergeant First Class Agustín Ramos Calero (June 2, 1919 – February 10, 1989) was awarded 22 decorations and medals from the U.S. Army for his actions during World War II and the Korean War, thus becoming the most decorated Puerto Rican and Hispanic soldier in the United States military during that war.

== Early years ==
Calero was born and raised in the town of Isabela, Puerto Rico, which is located in the northern region of Puerto Rico. The economic situation in Puerto Rico during the 1930s was difficult as a result of the Great Depression. Due to the shortage of jobs in the island, many Puerto Ricans joined the United States Army which offered a guaranteed income.

== World War II ==
In 1941, Calero joined the Army and was assigned to Puerto Rico's 65th Infantry Regiment at Camp Las Casas in Santurce, Puerto Rico. There he received his training as a rifleman. Upon the outbreak of World War II, Calero was reassigned to the Third U.S. Infantry Division and sent to Europe. In 1945, Calero's company was in the vicinity of Colmar, France and engaged in combat against a squad of German soldiers in what is known as the Battle of Colmar Pocket. Calero attacked the squad, killing ten of them and capturing 21 shortly before being wounded himself. Following these events, he was nicknamed "One-Man Army" by his comrades. For these actions he was awarded the Silver Star. Calero had been wounded a total of four times in Europe when the war ended. He was awarded a total of 22 decorations and medals for his actions, making him the Puerto Rican soldier with the most military decorations in all of the United States during that conflict.

== Korean War ==
Calero returned to Puerto Rico and was reassigned once more to the 65th Infantry Regiment. The 65th Infantry departed from Puerto Rico on August 26, 1950, when the United States became involved in the Korean War. They arrived in Pusan, Korea on September 23. In Korea, Calero was assigned to Headquarters and Headquarters Company of the regiment. He was the personal assistant to the regimental commander, Brigadier General (then Colonel) William W. Harris.

== Later years ==
Calero retired from the United States Army in 1962 after total of 21 years of service with the rank of Sergeant First Class. At the end of his years, Calero suffered from terminal cancer. Sergeant First Class Agustín Ramos Calero died on February 10, 1989, at 69 years of age and was buried with full military honors in the Puerto Rico National Cemetery in Bayamón, Puerto Rico.

== Awards and Decorations ==
Among Calero's decorations were the following:

Badge	Combat Infantryman Badge		
1st row	Silver Star	Bronze Star Medal Retroactively Awarded, 1947	Purple Heart with 3 Oak leaf clusters
2nd row	Army Good Conduct Medal	American Campaign Medal	European-African-Middle Eastern Campaign Medal with 4 Campaign stars
3rd row	World War II Victory Medal	Army of Occupation Medal	National Defense Service Medal with 1 Oak leaf cluster
4th row	Korean Service Medal	United Nations Service Medal Korea	Korean War Service Medal Retroactively Awarded, 2003
Unit Awards	Presidential Unit Citation	Meritorious Unit Commendation	Korean Presidential Unit Citation

Croix de Guerre France	Cross of Valor Greece

== Other Honors ==
His hometown, Isabela, honored his memory by naming an avenue after him.

In 2020 SFC Agustín Ramos Calero was posthumously inducted to the Puerto Rico Veterans Hall of Fame.

In 2022 SFC Agustín Ramos Calero was posthumously inducted to the 3rd Infantry Division Marne Hall of Fame.

== See also ==
- List of Puerto Ricans
- List of Puerto Rican military personnel
- 65th Infantry Regiment
- Puerto Ricans in World War II
- Borinqueneers Congressional Gold Medal
