= César Luis González =

First Puerto Rican pilot in the US Air Force

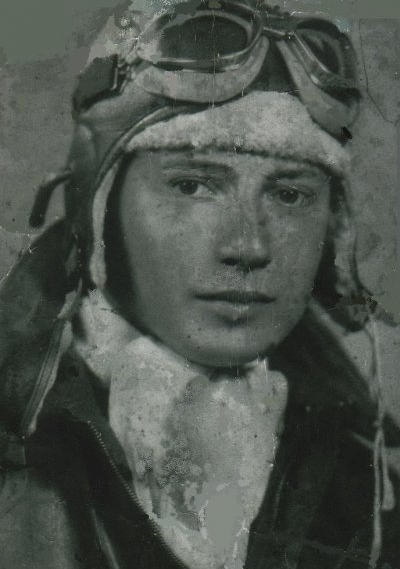
- 1st Lt. González was the first Puerto Rican pilot in the United States Army Air Forces.
- Born: June 10, 1919; Adjuntas, Puerto Rico
- Died: November 22, 1943 (aged 24); Castelvetrano, Sicily
- Burial place: Puerto Rico National Cemetery in Bayamón, Puerto Rico
- Military career
- Allegiance: United States of America
- Branch: United States Army Air Forces
- Service years: 1941–1943
- Rank: First Lieutenant
- Unit: Twelfth Air Force
- Conflicts: World War II; Operation Husky
- Awards: Purple Heart; Air Medal

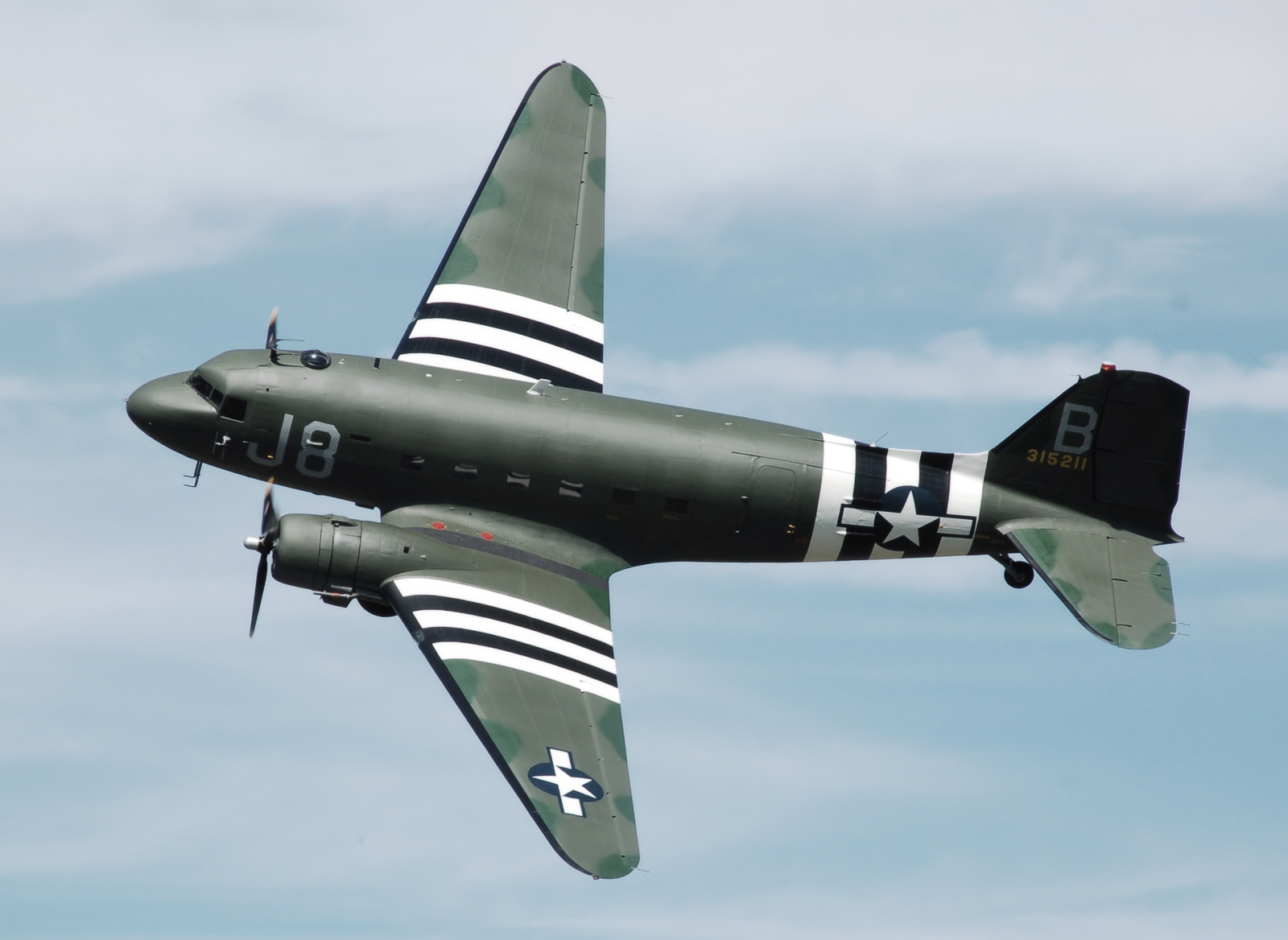
A C-47 (C-53D) type of aircraft flown by Capt. Richard Ott and 2nd Lt. González

First Lieutenant César Luis González (June 10, 1919 – November 22, 1943) was an officer in the United States Army Air Forces during World War II. Gonzalez was the first Puerto Rican pilot in the United States Army Air Forces, one of the first to participate in the July 1943 invasion of Sicily, and the first Puerto Rican pilot to die in World War II. His name is listed on the "Roll of Honor" of the 314th Troop Carrier Group World War II and his hometown Adjuntas and the capital of Puerto Rico, San Juan, have honored his memory by naming a street after him.

== Early years ==
González (birth name: César Luis González Cardona) was born to Felix Gonzalez and Augusta Cardona in the town of Adjuntas which is located in the mid-western section of Puerto Rico. He was one of five siblings who were raised in the family farm. González received his primary and secondary education at Escuela Secundaria Armstrong and Ponce High School in the town of Ponce.

His uncle wanted him to study engineering at the University of Puerto Rico in Mayagüez, however he decided that he would prefer to become an aviator. González saved the money which he earned while working with his uncle with the intention of going to an aviation school in California.

González made use of the Civilian Pilot Training Program, a federal program which came about with the approval of the Civil Aeronautics Act of 1938. The CPTP used the classrooms of the California Flyers School of Aviation at Inglewood, California, which was supported by government funds and which provided a pool of young civilian pilots who could be available for military service if war came. Executive Order 8974, which was signed on December 12, 1941, transferred the CPTP into a wartime program under the War Training Service (WTS). All WTS graduates were then required to sign a contract agreeing to enter the military following graduation.

== World War II ==
Upon the outbreak of World War II, González joined the United States Army and was assigned to the United States Army Air Forces (USAAF), a component of the United States Army, at Albuquerque, New Mexico, where he received advanced aviator training. The USAAF was the military aviation arm of the United States of America during and immediately after World War II. After completing his training he was commissioned a Second Lieutenant and assigned to the 12th Air Force / 52nd Troop Carrier Wing / 314 Troop Transport Group / 32nd Squadron.

The 12th Air Force was established in the United States during World War II to be the Army Air Forces air component of Operation Torch. In 1942, the 12th Air Force initially moved to England for training. In November 1942, it was transferred to Tunisia under the command of Lieutenant General Carl Spaatz. The 314th Transport Group was activated on March 2, 1942 and renamed 314th Troop Carrier Group in July 1942. The 314th used C-47's and C-53's in preparing for duty overseas and was moved to French Morocco of the Mediterranean theater in May 1943 and assigned to the 12th Air Force. Operating in Tunisia, the 32nd TCS successfully flew its first airborne assault on Sicily.

González was one of the initial participants of the invasion of Sicily on July 10, 1943 also known as Operation Husky. He was the co-pilot of a C-53D Skytrain, a.k.a. Dakota, of which Captain Richard B. Ott was the pilot. The C-53D is a variant of the C-47 with the difference that it had a 24 Volt DC electrical system. During the invasion of Sicily, he flew on two night missions, the first on July 9, where his mission was to release paratroops of 82nd Airborne Division on the area of Gela and the second on July 11, when he dropped reinforcements in the area . His unit was awarded a "DUC" for carrying out this second mission in spite of bad weather and heavy attack by enemy ground and naval forces. A "DUC" award is a "Distinguished Unit Citation" or Badge, which now called the Presidential Unit Citation (PUC). The Presidential Unit Citation is awarded to units of the Armed Forces of the United States and allies for extraordinary heroism in action against an armed enemy. Several advanced landing airfields were built by United States Army engineers in the area around the city of Gela which was used by the 12th Air Force during the Italian Campaign.

== Death and legacy ==
On November 22, 1943, 2nd Lt. González's plane crashed during training off the end of the runway at Castelvetrano. Capt. Ott and the Crew Chief perished along with González. González was survived by his parents (both now deceased), his brothers Felix Augusto and Hernan González (both now deceased) and his sisters Luz Virginia and Nilda González. González was posthumously promoted to First Lieutenant and on March 18, 1949, his body was interred with full military honors in the Puerto Rico National Cemetery, Section: A; Row: 0, Site: 175; in Bayamón, Puerto Rico.

González's name is listed on the "Roll of Honor" of the 314th Troop Carrier Group World War II; 32nd, 50th, 61st, and 62nd Squadrons. His name is also inscribed on Panel 5; Line 12 in Puerto Rico's "Monumento de la Recordacion", a monument dedicated to the Puerto Ricans who have fallen in combat, which is located in front of the Capital Building in San Juan, Puerto Rico. Both his hometown and the Capital of Puerto Rico, San Juan, honored his memory by naming a street after him. Adjuntas named the street "Calle Cesar González" and San Juan "Teniente Cesar González's Ave."

In 2020 César Luis González was posthumously inducted to the Puerto Rico Veterans Hall of Fame.

== Awards and decorations ==
Among González's awards and decorations were the following:

Awards:

WW II Army Air Force Pilot Badge
Purple Heart	Air Medal	World War II Victory Medal
American Campaign Medal	European-African-Middle Eastern Campaign Medal	Presidential Unit Citation

== See also ==
- List of Puerto Ricans
- List of Puerto Rican military personnel
- Military history of Puerto Rico
- Puerto Ricans in World War II
- Hispanics in the United States Air Force
