= Ozona, Florida =

- Unincorporated community
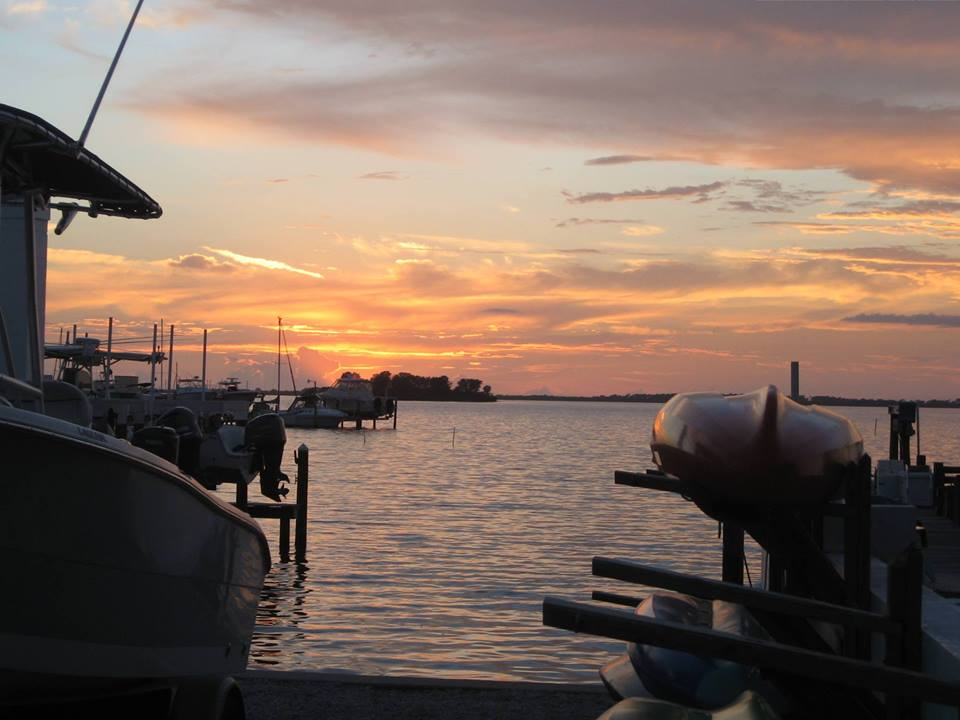
- Ozona sunset

- Location within Florida
- Coordinates: 28°04′10″N 82°46′32″W
- Country: United States
- State: Florida
- County: Pinellas
- Elevation: 10 ft (3.0 m)
- Time zone: UTC-5 (Eastern (EST))
  - Summer (DST): UTC-4 (EDT)
- ZIP code: 34660
- Area code: 727
- GNIS feature ID: 288348

Ozona is an unincorporated community located within the census-designated place of Palm Harbor, Pinellas County, Florida, United States, located 4 miles (6.4 km) north of downtown Dunedin. Ozona has a post office with ZIP code 34660. The first recorded homestead in Ozona was that of Walton Whitehurst in 1875.
