= Puerto Rico National Cemetery =

Veterans cemetery in Bayamón, Puerto Rico

- U.S. National Register of Historic Places
- U.S. Historic district
- Puerto Rico Historic Sites and Zones
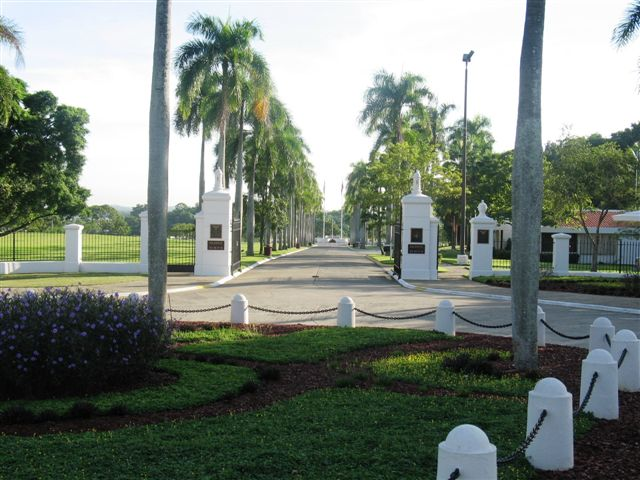

- Location within Puerto Rico
- Location: Bayamón, Puerto Rico
- Coordinates: 18°24′44″N 66°10′00″W
- Built: 1949
- NRHP reference No.: 83002298
- RNSZH No.: 2000-(RMSJ)-00-JP-SH

Significant dates
- Added to NRHP: September 26, 1983
- Designated RNSZH: February 3, 2000

Puerto Rico National Cemetery is a United States national cemetery located in the city of Bayamón, in the Commonwealth of Puerto Rico. It encompasses 108.2 acres (43.8 ha) of land, and at the end of 2005, had 44,722 interments. Until 2021, it was the only United States National Cemetery in Puerto Rico. A second United States National Cemetery was built in Morovis, Puerto Rico because the cemetery in Bayamón has reached its capacity.

== History ==
The land in which the cemetery is located was under the jurisdiction of the United States Navy since 1898, when Spain ceded Puerto Rico to the United States as a consequence of the treaties signed which officially ended the Spanish–American War. The area was used as a machine gun firing range during World War II.

The Government of the United States decided that the site, which is located in Bayamon and is approximately 13 miles from San Juan, would be suitable for the construction of a new cemetery. The land was transferred to the stewardship of the United States Department of the Army and the private firm of Font & Montilla was contracted to build the cemetery.

The cemetery was dedicated on Veterans Day in 1949, in a ceremony attended by Luis Muñoz Marín, the Governor of Puerto Rico, and Major General Herman Feldman, the Quartermaster of the US Army. The cemetery has become a shrine to the Puerto Rican veterans who have served in the United States military and those who perished while on active duty. In 1962, the remains of those interred on all other five military cemeteries on the island were transferred there.

The Puerto Rico National Cemetery was listed on the National Register of Historic Places on September 26, 1983, and on the Puerto Rico Register of Historic Sites and Zones on February 3, 2000.

== Morovis National (Veterans) Cemetery ==
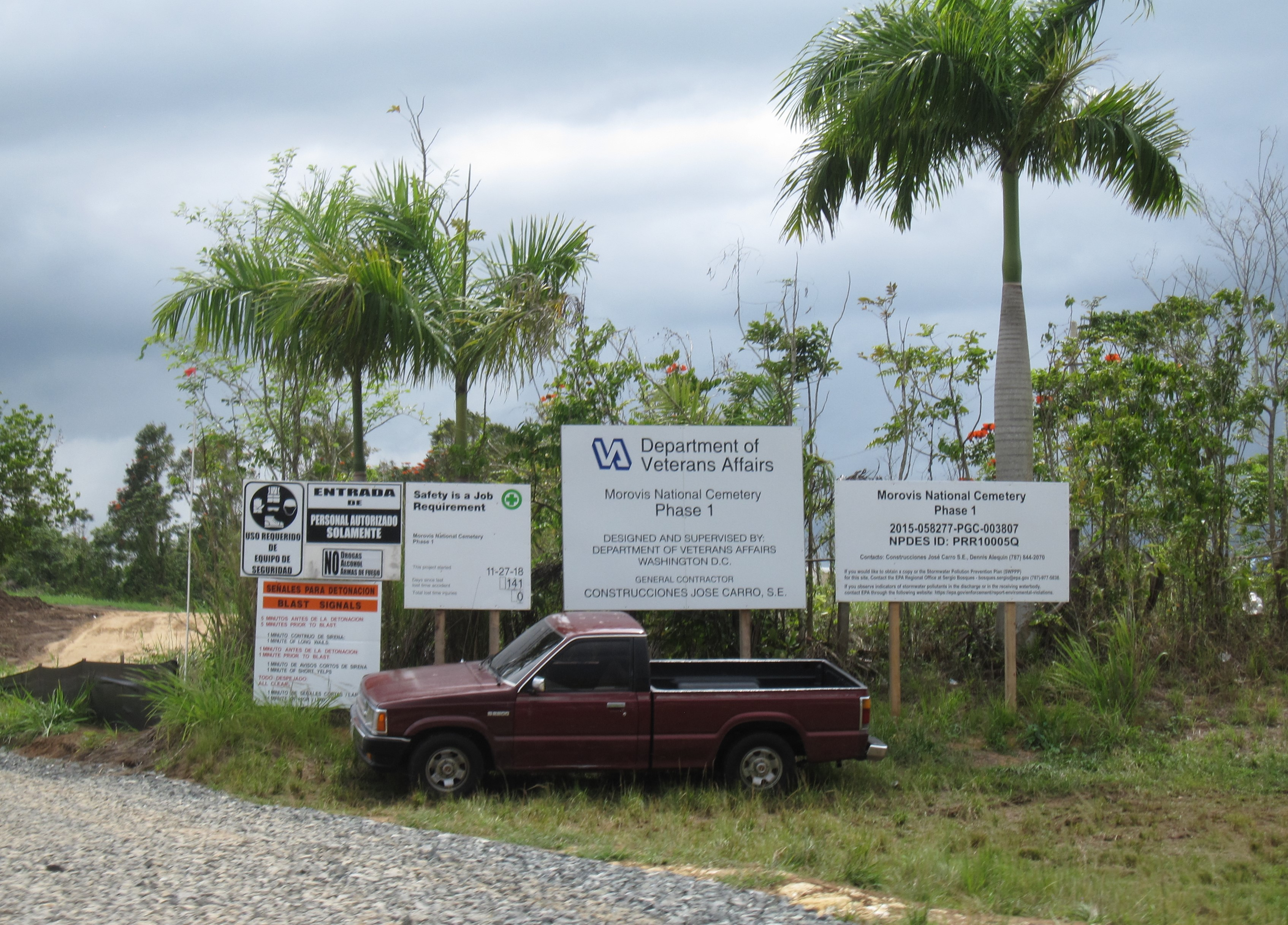
Morovis National Cemetery, construction Phase I

The Morovis National Cemetery, a second United States National Cemetery, was built in Morovis within a 247.5-acre parcel of land that can be accessed from Highway 137 at Km. 11.2. It was built to replace the existing Puerto Rico National Cemetery located in Bayamón, which would reach its capacity in 2022. Construction was underway in 2019 with interments slated to begin in 2021. The U.S. Department of Veterans Affairs (VA) held a dedication ceremony for the cemetery on December 12, 2020.

== Notable interments ==
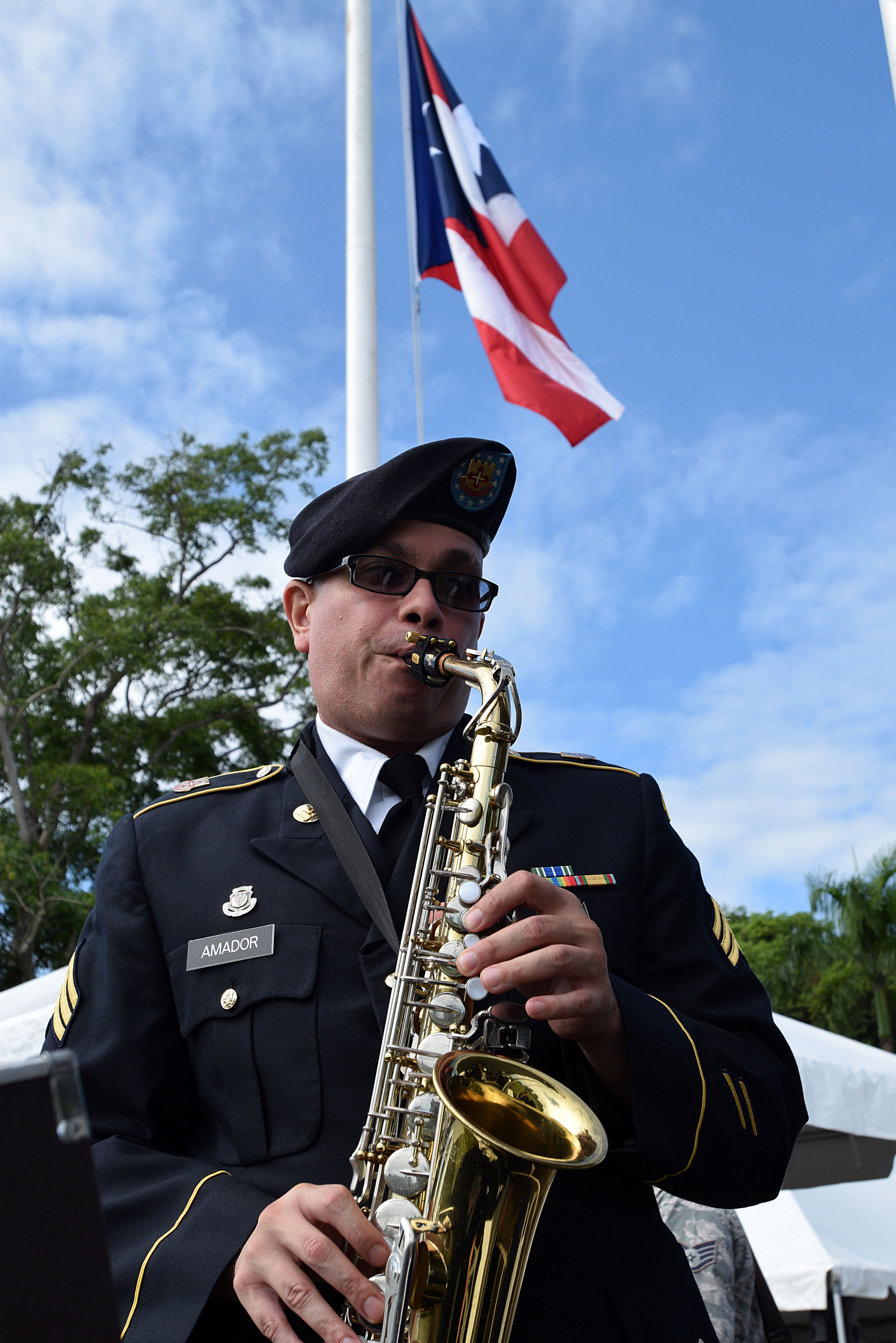
Memorial Day 2014 at Puerto Rico National Cemetery

The following list has the names of distinguished Puerto Ricans, and non-Puerto Rican veterans who have made Puerto Rico their home, who served in the US military and are interred there.

- Medal of Honor recipients
  - Fernando Luis García Ledesma (1929–1952 †), PFC, US Marine Corps. García Ledesma was the first Puerto Rican awarded the Medal of Honor (cenotaph).
  - Juan E. Negrón-Martínez (1929–1996), Master Sergeant, US Army. Negrón, a member of the 65th Infantry Regiment, was awarded the medal posthumously.
  - Eurípides Rubio (1938–1966 †), Captain, US Army. Recipient for his actions in the Vietnam War.
- Others
  - Bailey K. Ashford, Colonel, US Army. Spanish–American War veteran, doctor, parasitologist, author. A pioneering physician, Ashford organized and conducted a parasite treatment campaign, which cured approximately 300,000 persons (one-third of the Puerto Rico population) and reduced the death rate from this anemia by 90 percent.
  - Carlos Betances Ramírez, Colonel, US Army. Betances Ramírez was the only Puerto Rican to command a Battalion in the Korean War. Section K, Site 3030.
  - Modesto Cartagena, Sergeant First Class, US Army. Served in the 65th Infantry Regiment, an all-Puerto Rican regiment also known as "The Borinqueneers", during World War II and the Korean War. He was the most decorated Puerto Rican soldier in history.
  - Carlos Fernando Chardón, Major General, US Army. Puerto Rico Adjutant General from 1969 to 1973. Chardon was also the Secretary of State of Puerto Rico from 1969 to 1973
  - Virgilio N. Cordero, Jr., Brigadier General, US Army. Battalion Commander of the 31st Infantry Regiment. He documented his experiences as a prisoner of war and his participation in the infamous Bataan Death March of World War II.
  - Juan César Cordero Dávila, Major General, US Army. Cordero Dávila was the commanding officer of the 65th Infantry Regiment during the Korean War, rising to become one of the highest ranking ethnic officers in the United States Army.
  - Efrain Figueroa-Melendez, Staff Sergeant, US Army. Figueroa-Melendez, awarded the Distinguished Service Cross, was a member of Company D, 3d Battalion, 8th Infantry Regiment, 4th Infantry Division. On three occasions Staff Sergeant Figueroa-Melendez purposely drew communist volleys on himself to permit his men to draw back to protected positions. Plot: E 563.
  - César Luis González, First Lieutenant, US Air Force. During World War II, González became the first pilot from Puerto Rico to fly for the US Army Air Corps and one of the first Puerto Ricans to die in combat during that conflict. He was posthumously promoted to 1st. Lt.
  - Mihiel "Mike" Gilormini, Brigadier General, US Air Force. A World War II hero, was the recipient of 5 Distinguished Flying Cross's and co-founder of the Puerto Rico Air National Guard. Gilormini had previously flown for the Royal Canadian Air Force (1941) and the Royal Air Force (1941–1942).
  - Gilberto José Marxuach, Colonel, US Army. Son of Teofilo Marxuach. He is known as "The Father of the San Juan Civil Defense". Plot: C 60.
  - Teófilo Marxuach, Lieutenant Colonel, US Army. Ordered the first shot fired in World War I on behalf of the United States on an armed German supply ship trying to force its way out of the San Juan Bay.
  - Elmy L. Matta, 1st. Lieutenant, US Army. Awarded the Distinguished Service Cross, as member of the 8th Cavalry Regiment (Infantry), 1st CAV DIV. Lieutenant Matta was killed while personally leading an assault of his company against the enemy in the face of intense small arms and automatic weapons fire.
  - José Antonio Muñiz, Lieutenant Colonel, US Army Air Force. Muñiz, together with then-Colonels Alberto A. Nido and Mihiel Gilormini, founded the Puerto Rico Air National Guard. In 1963, the Air National Guard Base, at the San Juan International airport in Puerto Rico, was renamed "Muñiz Air National Guard Base" in his honor.
  - Alberto A. Nido, Brigadier General, US Air Force. World War II hero who co-founded the Puerto Rico Air National Guard and served as its commander for many years.
  - Belisario Noriega, Master Sergeant, US Army. Awarded the Distinguished Service Cross, served with the 65th Infantry Regiment, 3d Infantry Division. He led his men through the hostile ranks of the enemy to the safety of the main line of resistance.
  - Ramón Núñez-Juárez (1931–1952 †), PFC, US Marine Corps. Recipient of the Navy Cross in the Korean War (cenotaph).
  - Agustín Ramos Calero, Sergeant First Class, US Army. Ramos Calero, with 22 military decorations, was the most decorated Hispanic soldier in all of the United States during World War II.
  - Charlie Robles, Puerto Rican singer and actor who served with the U.S. ARMY during the Vietnam War period.
  - Augusto Rodríguez, Lieutenant, United States Union Army. Rodríguez served in the American Civil War in the defenses of Washington, D.C., and led his men in the Battles of Fredericksburg and Wyse Fork.
  - Lizbeth Robles, SPC, US Army. First Puerto Rican female soldier born in Puerto Rico to die in Iraq.
  - Antonio Rodríguez Balinas, Brigadier General, US Army. Rodríguez Balinas was the first commander of the Office of the First US Army Deputy Command.
  - Antulio Segarra, Colonel, US Army. In 1943, Segarra became the first Puerto Rican Regular Army officer to command a Regular Army Regiment when he assumed the command of Puerto Rico's 65th Infantry Regiment which at the time was conducting security missions in the jungles of Panama. Plot: A, Row 0, Site 353.
  - Pedro Vázquez Rivera, Captain, US Marine Corps. Vázquez Rivera was an attorney and engineer who served as Puerto Rico's eighth Secretary of State from 1979 to 1981 under Governor Carlos Romero Barceló, Deputy Mayor of San Juan, Puerto Rico from 1984 to 1988 under Mayor Baltasar Corrada del Rio and executive director of the publicly owned Puerto Rico Electric Power Authority (PREPA) from 1977 to 1979.
  - Frances M. Vega, SPC, US Army. First stateside born Puerto Rican female soldier to die in a war.

=== Others ===
- Members of the Otero family murdered by serial killer Dennis Rader:
  - Joseph Otero, Sergeant, US Army.
  - Julie Otero, wife of Joseph Otero
  - Josephine Otero, daughter of Joseph and Julie Otero
  - Joseph Otero II, son of Joseph and Julie Otero
- John Ernest Sayle, British Merchant Marine crewmember killed during World War II; one of three gravesites of British Commonwealth servicemen buried in Puerto Rico administered by the Commonwealth War Graves Commission.
- Captain Elwood Palmes Walmsley, Royal Air Force pilot killed during World War II; one of three gravesites of British Commonwealth servicemen buried in Puerto Rico administered by the Commonwealth War Graves Commission.
- Navigator George Federic Johnston, Royal Air Force ferry command killed during World War II; one of three gravesites of British Commonwealth servicemen buried in Puerto Rico administered by the Commonwealth War Graves Commission.

=== Gallery of notable interments ===
Notable interments
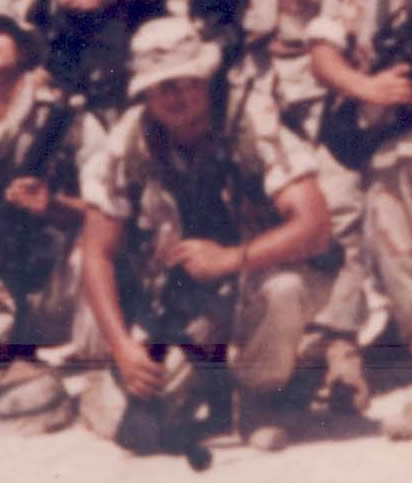
PFC Domingo Arroyo, Jr.

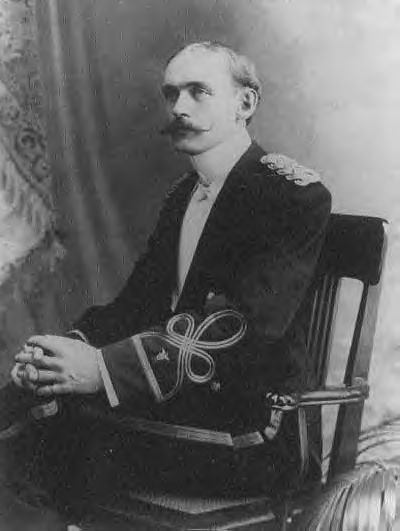
Col. Bailey K. Ashford

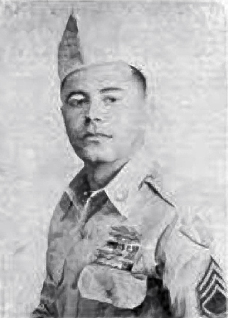
SFC Modesto Cartagena

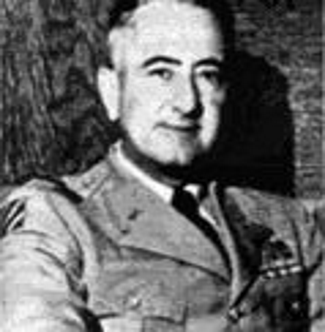
Maj. Gen. Juan César Cordero Dávila

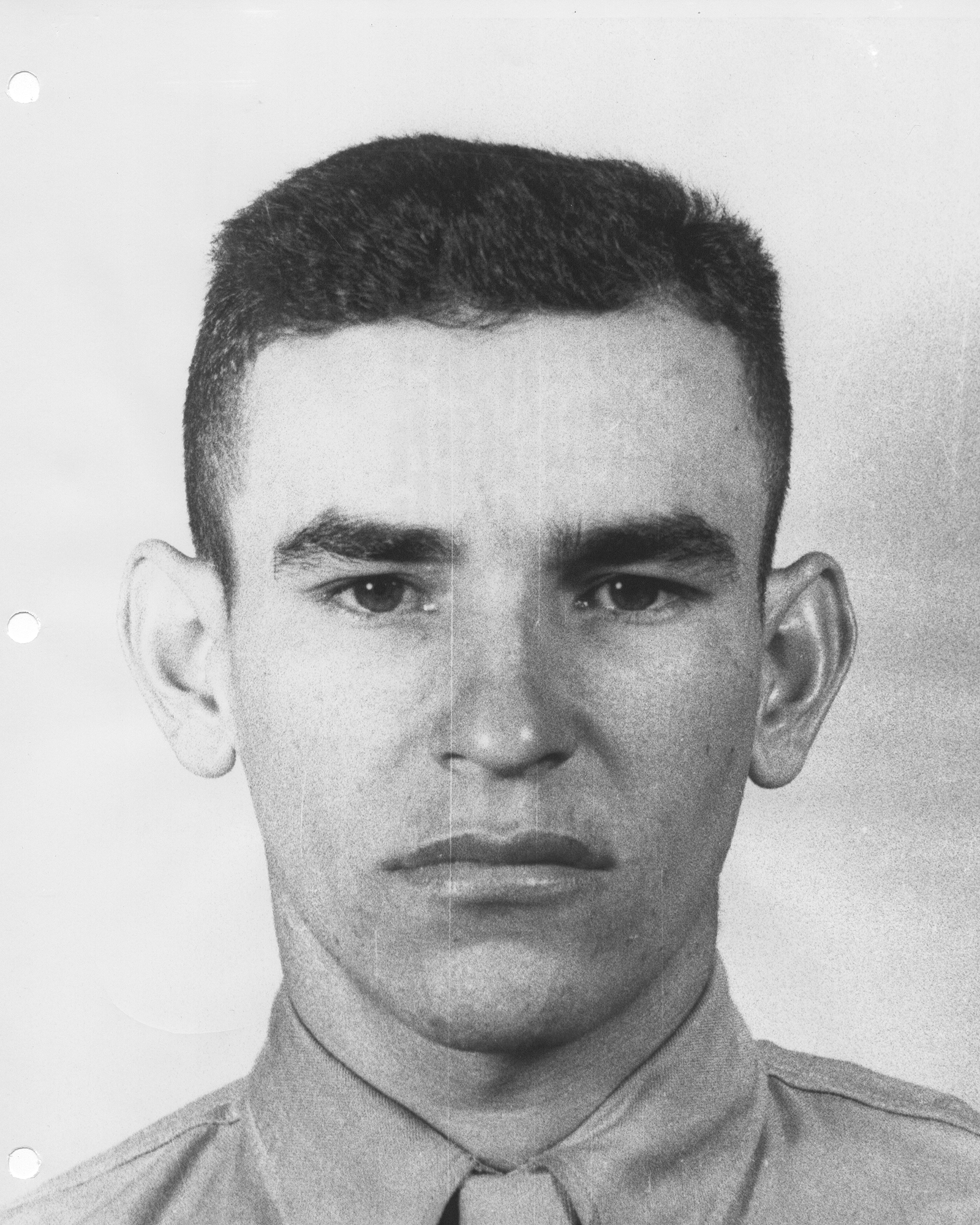
PFC Fernando Luis Garcia

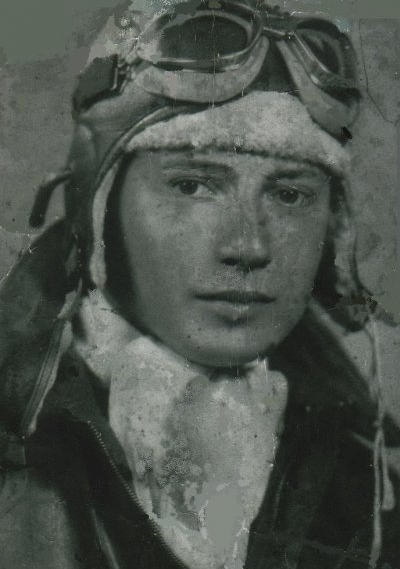
1st. Lt. Cesar Luis Gonzalez

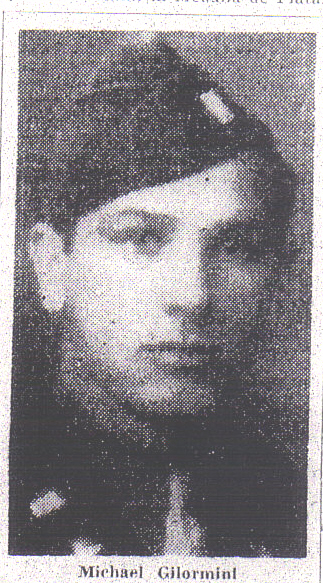
Brig. Gen. Mihiel Gilormini

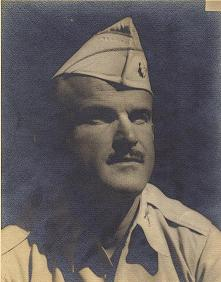
Col. Gilberto Marxuach

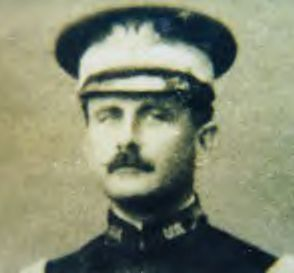
Lt. Col. Teofilo Marxuach

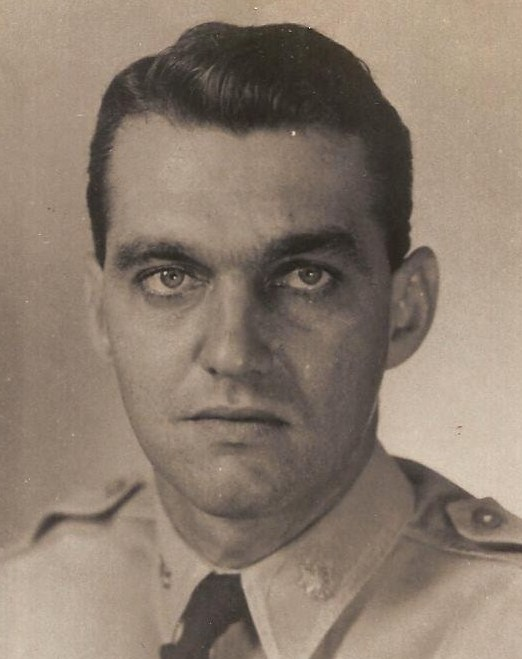
Lt. Col. José Antonio Muñiz

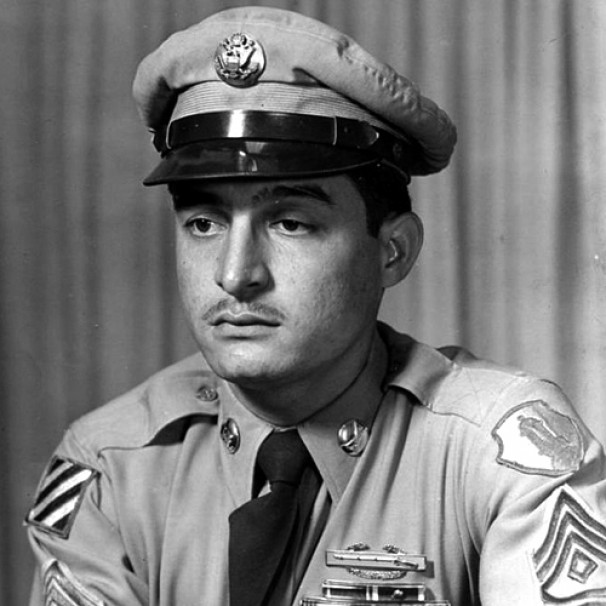
Master Sgt. Juan E. Negrón

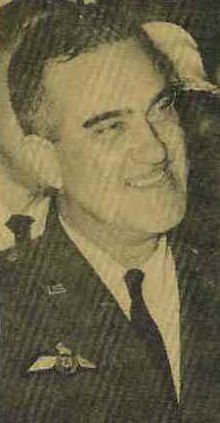
Brig. General Alberto A. Nido

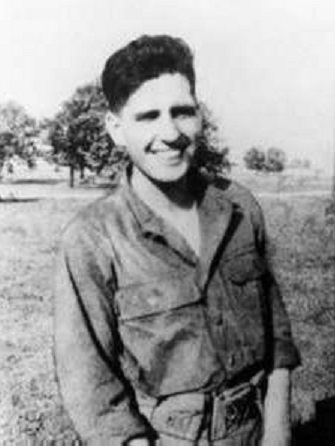
PFC Ramón Núñez-Juárez

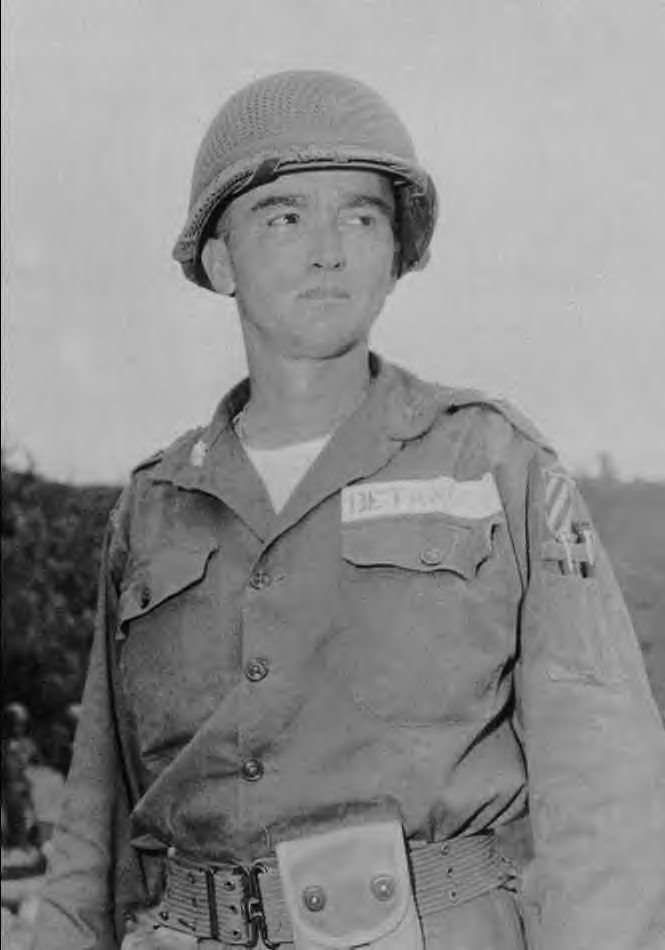
Col. Carlos Betances Ramirez

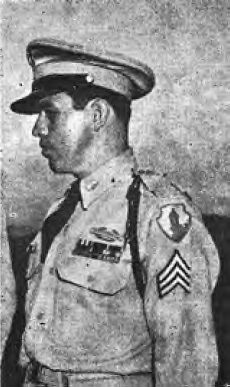
SFC Agustín Ramos Calero

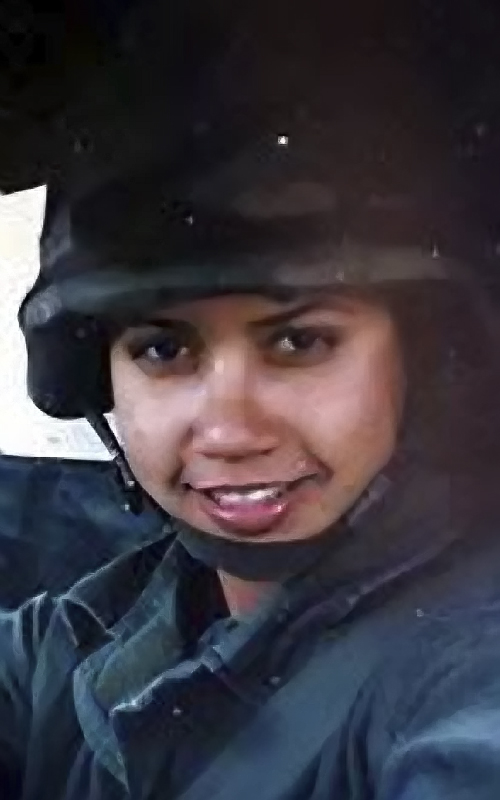
SPC Lizbeth Robles

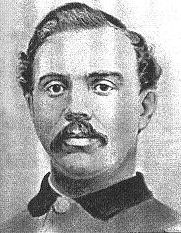
Lt. Augusto Rodriquez

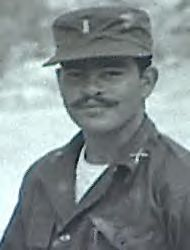
Brig. General Antonio Rodríguez Balinas

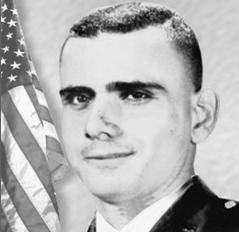
Capt. Euripides Rubio

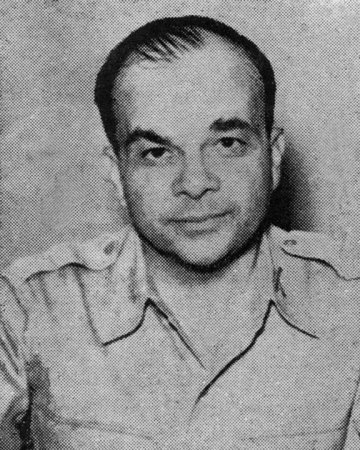
Col. Antulo Segarra

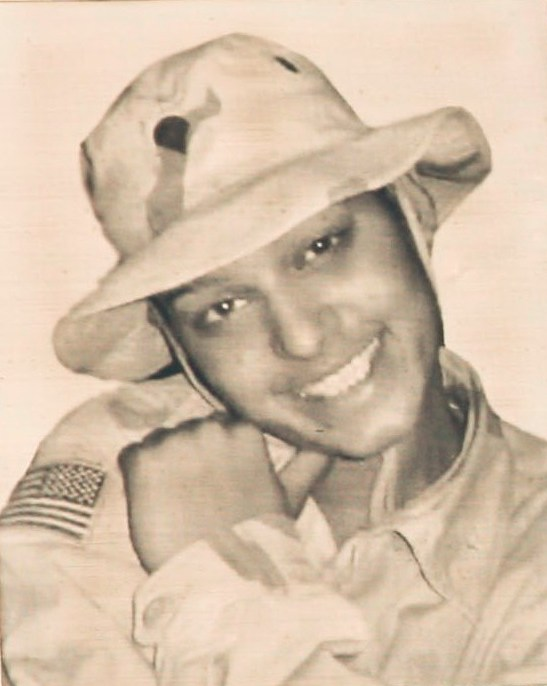
SPC Frances M. Vega

== See also ==
- List of Puerto Ricans
- List of Puerto Rican military personnel
