= USS Sloat (DE-245) =

1943 Edsall-class destroyer escort

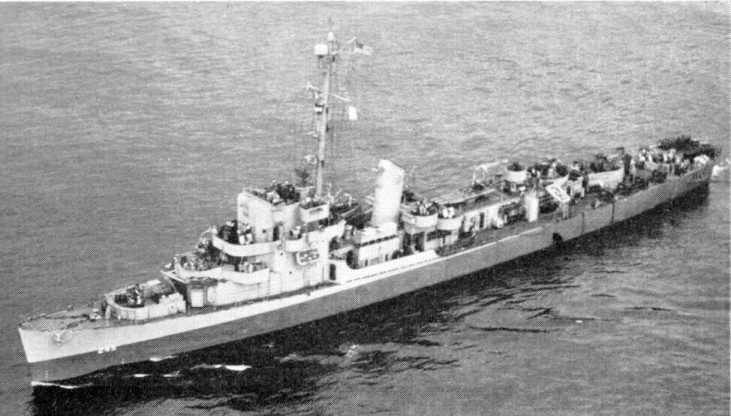
- USS Sloat (DE-245)

History

United States
- Namesake: John Drake Sloat
- Builder: Brown Shipbuilding Houston, Texas
- Laid down: 21 November 1942
- Launched: 21 January 1943
- Commissioned: 16 August 1943
- Decommissioned: 6 August 1947
- Stricken: 2 January 1971
- Fate: Sold for scrapping 10 April 1972

General characteristics
- Class & type: Edsall-class destroyer escort
- Displacement: 1,253 tons standard; 1,590 tons full load
- Length: 306 feet (93.27 m)
- Beam: 36.58 feet (11.15 m)
- Draft: 10.42 full load feet (3.18 m)
- Propulsion: 4 FM diesel engines, 4 diesel-generators, 6,000 shp (4.5 MW), 2 screws
- Speed: 21 knots (39 km/h)
- Range: 9,100 nmi. at 12 knots; (17,000 km at 22 km/h)
- Complement: 8 officers, 201 enlisted
- Armament: 3 × single 3 in (76 mm)/50 guns; 1 × twin 40 mm AA guns; 8 × single 20 mm AA guns; 1 × triple 21 in (533 mm) torpedo tubes; 8 × depth charge projectors; 1 × depth charge projector (hedgehog); 2 × depth charge tracks

USS Sloat (DE-245) was an Edsall-class destroyer escort built for the U.S. Navy during World War II. She served in the Atlantic Ocean the Pacific Ocean and provided destroyer escort protection against submarine and air attack for Navy vessels and convoys.

She was named in honor of Rear Admiral John Drake Sloat (1781–1867). She was laid down on 21 November 1942 by Brown Shipbuilding Co., Houston, Texas; launched on 21 January 1943; sponsored by Mrs. J. B. Deason; and commissioned on 16 August 1943, Lt. Comdr. Edmund Ernest García in command.

== World War II North Atlantic operations ==
Sloat moved to New Orleans, Louisiana, on 28 August and sailed from there on 5 September to Bermuda for her shakedown cruise. Following a post-shakedown yard availability period at Charleston, South Carolina., from 7 to 17 October, the escort sailed to New York. She escorted convoy UGS-22 from there, on 22 October, to Norfolk, Virginia, and returned. The first week in November, she escorted UGS-23 to Norfolk. On 11 November, Sloat, as a unit of Escort Division (CortDiv) 7, stood out of New York with convoy UGS-24 bound for Norfolk and North Africa. The convoy arrived at Casablanca on 2 December, and the escort picked up GUS-26 there, five days later, and returned to New York on 25 December 1943.

== Under attack by Luftwaffe aircraft ==
On 10 January 1944, Sloat joined UGS-30 en route to Casablanca and returned with GUS-29 on 22 February. The escort joined the New York section of convoy UGS-36 on 10 March and sailed to Norfolk where it rendezvoused with the main body. The convoy, consisting of 72 merchant ships and 18 LST's, was guarded by Task Force (TF) 64. En route to Bizerte, Tunisia, the convoy was attacked by the Luftwaffe on 1 April, approximately 56 miles west of Algiers. Two planes were shot down and two damaged while only one ship in the convoy was damaged. The convoy arrived at Bizerte on 3 April. Eight days later, Sloat joined another convoy and returned to New York on 1 May.

Following training exercises in Casco Bay, Maine, Sloat sailed from New York with USS Tripoli in Task Group (TG) 22.4, a submarine hunter-killer group on 24 May 1944. The group put into Argentia, Newfoundland, from 12 to 15 June and then went back to sea. Sloat returned to New York on 15 June and operated from there until 7 August when she sailed with TG 23.9 for the Caribbean. In September, they were operating off Newfoundland and returned to New York on 9 October 1944. The escort operated along the East Coast until 24 January 1945 when she joined task group TG 22.4 to hunt U-boats in the North Atlantic. Sloat returned to the East Coast and operated from New York to the Caribbean until 15 July when she was ordered to San Diego, California, and duty with the Pacific Fleet.

== Transferred to the Pacific Fleet ==
Sloat arrived at San Diego, California on 26 July 1945, and was ordered to sail for Pearl Harbor five days later. She arrived there on 7 August, and was ordered further west. From 20 August 1945 to 1 May 1946, she made supply runs to Saipan, Guam, Eniwetok, the Caroline Islands, Iwo Jima, and Shanghai. She returned to San Pedro, Los Angeles, on 1 May 1946 and was routed to Charleston, South Carolina, arriving on 20 May. On 12 September 1946, she sailed to Green Cove Springs, Florida, for inactivation. She was placed in reserve, out of commission, in January 1947. Sloat was struck from the Navy List on 2 January 1971 and sold to Peck Equipment Co., Portsmouth, Virginia, on 5 April 1972 for scrap.

== Awards ==
Sloat received one battle star for World War II service.
