= List of Puerto Rican women =

== Notable women in Puerto Rico ==
Prominent women in Puerto Rico include the following:

=== Actresses, comedians and directors ===
- Alicia Moreda, actress/comedian
- Camila Sagardia, actress and model
- Ivonne Belén, documentary director and producer.
- Jennifer Lopez, singer, actress, producer.
- Marquita Rivera, actress. First Puerto Rican to appear in a major Hollywood motion picture – Road to Rio
- Rita Moreno, actress, dancer, singer
- Roselyn Sánchez, actress. Films include Rush Hour 2 and Chasing Papi.
- Sylvia del Villard, actress, choreographer and dancer.
- Esther Sandoval, actress and pioneer in Puerto Rican Television.
- Rosario Dawson, actress, producer, singer, comic book writer, and political activist.
- La La Anthony, Television Personality, New York Times Best-Selling Author, businesswoman, actress, and producer.
- Aubrey Plaza, American actress, comedian, and producer.
- Gina Rodriguez, actress, director, women and Latino right activist, and philanthropist.
- Joan Smalls, actress and model

Government Officials

- Engineer Eileen M Vélez-Vega, first woman to become Puerto Rico’s Secretary of the Department of Transportation and Public Works and first Puerto Rican inducted in the US Space Camp Hall of Fame

=== Authors, playwrights and poets ===
- Alejandrina Benítez de Gautier, poet. Benítez de Gautier's collaboration with the "Aguinaldo Puertorriqueño" (Collection of Puerto Rican Poetry) gave her recognition as a great poet.
- Ana Lydia Vega, writer, Premio Juan Rulfo (1984), Premio Casa de las Américas (1982)
- Concha Meléndez, educator, poet, writer. First woman to belong to the Puerto Rican Academy of Languages.
- Georgina Lázaro, poet.
- Giannina Braschi, poet, novelist, dramatist. Author of the Spanglish classic Yo-Yo Boing! and United States of Banana
- Isabel Freire de Matos, writer and educator. Distinguished advocate for Puerto Rico's independence.
- Julia de Burgos, poet. Considered by many as the greatest Puerto Rican poet of all times.
- Judith Ortiz Cofer. author, poet. A Partial Remembrance of a Puerto Rican Childhood.
- Lola Rodríguez de Tió, poet. Wrote lyrics to the original version of the Puerto Rican anthem "La Borinqueña".
- María Bibiana Benítez, Puerto Rico's first female poet and one of its first playwrights
- Mayra Santos-Febres, author, poet, novelist, essayist, literary critic, professor of literature. Anamu y manigua, El orden escapado, Pez de Vidrio, Sirena Selena vestida de pena, Nuestra Señora de la Noche, La amante de Gardel
- Esmeralda Santiago, novelist.
- Mercedes Negrón Muñoz, poet. Influential poet whose work dealt with the everyday struggles of the common Puerto Rican.
- Pura Belpré, first Puerto Rican librarian in New York City, writer, collector of folktales, puppeteer.
- Rosario Ferré, short story writer and novelist, best known for "Eccentric Neighborhoods" and "Sweet Diamond Dust".
- Yolanda Arroyo Pizarro, novelist, short story writer, essayist.

=== Businesswomen and industrialists ===
- Camalia Valdés, businesswoman. President and CEO of Cerveceria India, Inc., Puerto Rico's largest brewery.
- Carlota Alfaro, fashion designer.
- Carolyn Aronson, businesswoman and founder of several companies across beauty, real estate, yachting, aviation and more. Some of her companies include It's A 10 Haircare, Be A 10 Cosmetics, Ex10sions (hair extensions), CLOUD (haircare), Fat Cloud Aviation (private jet company) and She’s A 10 Too (mega-yacht chartering company). Alongside her husband Jeff Aronson and Grammy-nominated artist Fat Joe, Carolyn co-founded Rewind It 10.
- Carmen Ana Culpeper, SBA Regional Director. First female Secretary of the Puerto Rico Department of the Treasury and first female president of the Puerto Rico Telephone Company.

=== Civil rights and/or political activists ===
- Ana María O'Neill, women's rights activist and educator. First female Professor of Business at the University of Puerto Rico. A women's rights activist, she urged women to defend their right to vote.
- Ana Roque, women's rights activist. Suffragist and one of the founders of the University of Puerto Rico.
- Blanca Canales, political activist. Nationalist leader who led the Jayuya Uprising in 1950 against U.S. colonial rule of Puerto Rico.
- Isabel González, civil rights activist. Young Puerto Rican mother who paved the way for Puerto Ricans to be given United States citizenship.
- Lolita Lebrón, political activist. Nationalist leader and activist. Lebrón was the leader of a group of nationalists, who proceeded to attack the United States House of Representatives in 1954.
- Luisa Capetillo, activist and writer. Social labor organizer and essayist who fought for women's rights, free love, and human emancipation.
- María de las Mercedes Barbudo, political activist. First female "Independentista". First woman to become an avid advocate of the Puerto Rican Independence..
- Mariana Bracetti, political activist. Bracetti was the leader of the "Lares's Revolutionary Council" during the Grito de Lares. Bracetti knit the first flag of the future "Republic of Puerto Rico".
- María Cadilla, women's rights activist. Women rights activist and one of the first women in Puerto Rico to earn a doctoral degree.
- Olga Viscal Garriga, political activist. Student leader at the University of Puerto Rico and spokesperson of the Puerto Rican Nationalist Party's branch in Río Piedras.

=== Composers, musicians and singers ===
- Iris Chacón, singer and vedette.
- Julita Ross, singer of danzas.
- Lucecita Benítez, singer. Winner of the 1969 "Festival de la Cancion Latina".
- Nydia Caro, singer.
- Ruth Fernández, singer.
- Sylvia Rexach, singer and composer.
- Ivy Queen, singer, songwriter, record producer
- Olga Tañon, singer
- La India, Known as Linda Viera Caballero, Salsa singer and songwriter
- Melina León, meringue singer and songwriter
- Ana Isabelle, singer, actress, dancer, and entrepreneur
- Kany García, singer and songwriter
- Melina Almodovar, singer, songwriter, dancer, and entertainer. Known as La Muñeca de la Salsa or La Chica del Bling.

=== Educators ===
- Edna Coll, educator and author. President of the Society of Puerto Rican Authors. Also founded the Puerto Rico Academy of Fine Arts.
- Lolita Tizol, educator. At a time when most people in Ponce, as in most of Puerto Rico, did not know how to read and write, Tizol took it upon herself to overcome challenges to help others.
- Margot Arce de Vázquez, educator. Founder of the Department of Hispanic Studies in the University of Puerto Rico.
- Nilita Vientós Gastón, educator. First female lawyer to work for the Department of Justice of Puerto Rico. Won a case before the Supreme Court for the use of the Spanish language in Puerto Rican courts.

=== Historians ===
- Delma S. Arrigoitia, historian and author. First person in the University of Puerto Rico to earn a master's degree in the field of history.
- Gladys Esther Tormes González, a historian and head archivist of the Archivo Histórico de Ponce in Ponce, Puerto Rico. Serving since 1974, she is the longest-serving archivist in the municipality of Ponce.
- Mariana Bracetti, one of the many leaders during the struggle for Puerto Rican independence, she helped to knit the original “Flag of Lares” which was displayed to show victory over the Spanish
- Socorro Giron, Puerto Rican historian, writer, and scholar. Author of "Ponce, el teatro La Perla y La Campana de la Almudaina: Historia de Ponce desde sus comienzos hasta la Segunda Decada del Siglo XX."

=== Journalists ===
- Carmen Jovet, journalist. First Puerto Rican woman to become news anchor in Puerto Rico.
- Isabel Cuchí Coll, journalist and author. Director of the Sociedad de Autores Puertorriqueños (Puerto Rican Authors Society).

=== Judges ===
- Carmen Consuelo Vargas, Federal District Court judge. First Puerto Rican female to become a federal district judge and chief justice.

=== Military personnel ===
- Carmen García Rosado, Private First Class, U.S. Women's Army Corps; was among the first 200 Puerto Rican women to be recruited into the WAC's during World War II; author of LAS WACS-Participacion de la Mujer Boricua en la Segunda Guerra Mundial (The WACs – The participation of the Puerto Rican women in the Second World War), the first book which documents the experiences of the first 200 Puerto Rican women to participate in said conflict as members of the armed forces of the United States
- Dolores Piñero, U.S. Army Medical Corps; despite the fact that she was not an active member of the military, she was the first Puerto Rican woman doctor to serve in the Army under contract during World War I; at first she was turned down, but after writing a letter to the Army Surgeon General in Washington, D.C. she was ordered to report to Camp Las Casas in Santurce, Puerto Rico; in October 1918, she signed her contract with the Army.
- Irene M. Zoppi, Brigadier General, U.S. Army Reserve. BG Zoppi is the first Puerto Rican woman promoted to the rank of general in the U.S. Army Reserve. Born and raised in Canóvanas, Puerto Rico as Irene Miller y Rodriguez, she began her career as a private first class with the Military Police Corps back in 1985. She is an example of Puerto Rico’s Public School Education System to include University. She was commissioned as a 2nd Lieutenant in 1988, and rose through the ranks until she earned her star in 2017.

Brig. Gen. Zoppi speaks five languages, is a Ph.D. and has three masters’ degrees. Her military assignments over the years included a deployment with the 3rd Armored Division during the Gulf War. She has earned numerous awards and decorations including the Legion of Merit, Bronze Star, Kuwait Liberation Medal (Kingdom of Saudi Arabia), and the Kuwait Liberation Medal (Government of Kuwait). Dr. Zoppi’s civilian achievements include serving as a Program Director for the National Intelligence University under the National Security Agency. You can learn more about Brig. Gen. (Dr.) Zoppi at the U.S. Army Reserve Official Website. Famous Kin. Brig. Gen. Zoppi’s famous kin include one very notable relationship. She is a first cousin five times removed from President Abraham Lincoln via Lincoln’s grandfather, also named Abraham Lincoln. In light of her own patriotic service to the United States, it is not surprising to find a number of notable patriots and cabinet members in Brig. Gen. Zoppi's family tree. These include familial connections to Amos Lincoln (Boston Tea Party participant), Elihu Washburne (Secretary of State), Nicholas Gilman (signer of the Constitution), John Hancock (signer of the Declaration of Independence), Nathanial Gorham (signer of the Constitution), and Salmon P. Chase (Secretary of the Treasury). In addition to Abraham Lincoln, other presidents with family ties to Brig. Gen. Zoppi include James Garfield, Gerald Ford, and both presidents Bush. Some of the more notable women include Juliette Gordon Low (founder of the Girl Scouts) and Amelia Earhart (aviation pioneer). There are also a number of celebrities, probably the most notable of which is Elvis Presley.

- Frances M. Vega, SPC, U.S. Army; on 2 November 2003, became the first female soldier of Puerto Rican descent to die in a combat zone during Operation Iraqi Freedom
- María Inés Ortiz, Captain, U.S. Army; of Puerto Rican descent; first United States Army nurse to die in combat during Operation Iraqi Freedom and the first to die in combat since the Vietnam War
- Marta Carcana, Major General, U.S. Army; in 2015, became the first woman to be named Adjutant General of the Puerto Rican National Guard
- Michelle Fraley (née Hernández), Colonel, U.S. Army; became in 1984 the first Puerto Rican woman to graduate from West Point Military Academy; former chief of staff of the Army Network Enterprise Technology Command
- Verónica E. Báez Calderón, Lt Col, USAF. First born and raised Puerto Rican female, commissioned from USAF Det 755 ROTC, who became a C-130 E/H aircraft pilot. She flew combat missions out of Balad, Iraq, during Operation Iraqi Freedom (OIF). Later in her career, she became an intelligence officer, specialized in South American matters. She is trilingual and a fully qualified joint officer.

=== Physicians, scientists and inventors ===
- Amri Hernández-Pellerano, NASA engineer. Develops energy equipment at NASA's Goddard Space Flight Center.
- Dr. Miriam Rodón-Naveira, NASA scientist. First Latino woman to hold the Deputy Directorship for the Environmental Sciences Division within the National Exposure Research Laboratory.
- Olga D. González-Sanabria, NASA engineer. Highest ranking Latino at NASA Glenn Research Center and a member of the Ohio Women's Hall of Fame.
- Yajaira Sierra Sastre, NASA scientist. Performs preliminary testing and research work in NASA in the area of food consumption and health of astronauts for future mission to Mars.

=== Politicians ===
- Felisa Rincón de Gautier, mayor. First woman to be elected mayor of a capital city in the Americas (Western Hemisphere).
- María Luisa Arcelay, legislator. First woman in Puerto Rico and in all of Latin America to be elected to a government legislative body.
- María de Pérez Almiroty, first woman elected to the Senate of Puerto Rico
- Sila María Calderón, governor. First woman governor of Puerto Rico, elected in November 2000. She was the former mayor of San Juan.

=== Religion ===
- Isolina Ferré, nun. Presidential Medal of Freedom awardee.
- Juanita García Peraza, religious leader. Founder of the "Mita" religion.

=== Sports ===
- Anita Lallande, olympic swimmer and gold medal winner. Holds the island's record for most medals won at CAC Games with a total of 17 and 10 gold.
- Angelita Lind, athlete. Track and field athlete.
- Ivelisse Echevarría, softball player. Inducted into the International Softball Federation Hall of Fame (2003).
- Rebekah Colberg, athlete. Pioneer women participant in the 1938 Central American and Caribbean Games and gold medal winner in discus and javelin throws.

== Notable stateside Puerto Rican women ==
Women from Puerto Rico or of Puerto Rican descent that have become prominent in the mainland United States include the following:

=== Actresses, comedians and directors ===
- Chita Rivera, actress, winner of two Tony Awards
- Jennifer López, actress, singer, dancer
- Lana Parilla, actress, singer
- Míriam Colón, actress and founder of The Puerto Rican Traveling Theatre. Her films include Scarface).
- Rita Moreno, actress. First Latino woman to win the following four major awards: an Oscar, a Tony Award, an Emmy Award and a Grammy Award
- Rosario Dawson, actress, producer, singer, comic book writer, and political activist.
- La La Anthony, Television Personality, New York Times Best-Selling Author, businesswoman, actress, and producer.
- Aubrey Plaza, American actress, comedian, and producer.
- Gina Rodriguez, actress, director, women and Latino right activist, and philanthropist.
- Joan Smalls, actress and model

=== Authors, playwrights and poets ===
- Giannina Braschi, poet, novelist, and Latinx political philosopher. Author of the Spanglish classic novel Yo-Yo Boing!, the postmodern poetry epic Empire of Dreams, and the book on Puerto Rican independence, United States of Banana.
- Judith Ortíz Cofer, poet, writer and essayist. First Latino to win an O. Henry Prize. First recipient of the Pura Belpre Award for Hispanic children's literature.
- Micol Ostow, author. Ostow wrote of "Mind Your Manners, Dick and Jane". Her novel, "Emily Goldberg Learns to Salsa", was named a New York Public Library Book for the Teen Age.
- Nicholasa Mohr, writer. First Latino woman to have literary works published by the major commercial publishing houses, and longest continuously published Latino female writer for these publishing houses.
- Pura Belpré, author. First Puerto Rican librarian in New York City.
- Rosario Ferré, author of Sweet Diamond Dust, Eccentric Neighborhoods, and House on the Lagoon.

=== Businesswomen and industrialists ===
- Aída Álvarez, Cabinet member. First Latino woman to hold a sub-cabinet level position in the federal U.S. executive branch. She performed as director of the Small Business Administration.
- María Vizcarrondo-De Soto, corporate CEO. First Latino woman to become the president and CEO of the United Way of Essex and West Hudson.
- Nina Tassler, corporate president. President of CBS Entertainment. Highest profile Latino woman in network television and one of the few executives who has the power to greenlight series.

=== Civil rights and/or political activists ===
- Helen Rodríguez-Trías, physician and women's rights activist. First Latino president of the American Public Health Association and the recipient of the Presidential Citizen's Medal.
- Sylvia Méndez, civil rights activist and educator. Instrumental in the 1946 landmark desegregation case of Mendez v. Westminster which successfully ended de jure segregation in California. paving the way for the American civil rights movement.

=== Composers, musicians and singers ===
- Myrta Silva, singer and composer.
- Olga Tañón, singer and composer.
- Nedra Talley, founding member of "The Ronettes" a 1960s girl Rock n Roll group. She was inducted into the Rock and Roll Hall of Fame in 2007, together with the other two original members of the group.

=== Educators ===
- Ninfa Segarra, education administrator. President of the New York City Board of Education 2000–2002.

=== Journalists ===
- Bárbara Bermudo, journalist. Co-host of Univision's Primer Impacto.
- Elizabeth Vargas, co-anchor of ABC World News Tonight.
- María Celeste Arrarás, anchorwoman for Al Rojo Vivo.

=== Judges and law enforcement ===
- Dora Irizarry, Federal District Judge. First Latino woman to serve as state judge in New York.
- Faith Evans, U.S. Marshal. First woman to become a U.S. Marshal.
- Sonia Sotomayor, U.S. Supreme Court Associate Justice. First Puerto Rican woman to serve as an (2d Cir.) U.S. Circuit Court of Appeals judge and first Latino to become a U.S. Supreme Court Associate Justice.
- Vanessa Ruiz, Court of Appeals Judge. Associate Judge of the District of Columbia Court of Appeals.

=== Military personnel ===
- Carmen Contreras-Bozak, Tech4, U.S. Women's Army Corps. Contreras-Bozak was the first Latino to serve in the U.S. Women's Army Corps. She served as an interpreter and in numerous administrative positions during World War II.
- Linda García Cubero, U.S. Air Force captain. First Latino woman to graduate from the United States Air Force Academy and the first to graduate from an American Military Academy.
- Olga E. Custodio, U.S. Air Force lieutenant colonel. First Latino woman to become a U.S. military pilot. Also the first Latina to become a commercial airline captain.
- Rose Franco, CWO3, U.S. Marine Corps. First latino woman Chief Warrant Officer in the Marine Corps. Administrative Assistant to the Secretary of the Navy.
- Haydee Javier Kimmich, U.S. Navy captain. Highest ranking Latino woman in the Navy.
- Carmen Lozano Dumler, 2nd Lieutenant, U.S. Women's Army Corps. Dumler was one of the first Puerto Rican women Army officers. In 1944, she was sworn in as a 2nd Lieutenant and assigned to the 161st General Hospital in San Juan.
- María Rodríguez Denton, U.S. Navy lieutenant. First Puerto Rican woman to become an officer in the United States Navy as member of the WAVES.
- Maritza Sáenz Ryan, U.S. Army colonel. Head of the Department of Law at the United States Military Academy. She is the first woman and first Latino West Point graduate to serve as an academic department head.
- Irene M. Zoppi, U.S. Army Brigadier General, first Puerto Rican woman to be made a U.S. Army general (2017).

=== Physicians, scientists and inventors ===
- Dr. Antonia Coello Novello, physician. First Latino and first woman U.S. Surgeon General (1990–93).
- Mercedes Reaves Research engineer and scientist. Reaves is responsible for the design of a viable full-scale solar sail and the development and testing of a scale model solar sail at NASA Langley Research Center.
- Monserrate Román, microbiologist. Participated in the building of the International Space Station.

=== Politicians ===
- Carmen E. Arroyo, state legislator. First Puerto Rican woman elected to any state assembly, chair New York Hispanic Legislative Caucus.
- Gloria Tristani, federal commissioner. First latino woman to serve as commissioner of the Federal Communications Commission (FCC).
- María Colón Sánchez, state legislator. First Latino woman elected to the Connecticut General Assembly.
- Nydia Velázquez, member of Congress. First Puerto Rican congresswoman. Chair of House Small Business Committee.
- Wilda Diaz, mayor. First female mayor of Perth Amboy, New Jersey, and first Puerto Rican woman elected mayor in that state.

=== Religion ===
- Bavi Edna Rivera, Episcopal bishop. First Latino woman to become a bishop and the 12th woman consecrated a bishop in the Episcopal Church.

=== Sports ===
- Gigi Fernández, tennis player. First Puerto Rican female athlete to turn professional, first Puerto Rican woman to ever win an Olympic gold medal, and the first to be inducted into the International Tennis Hall of Fame.
- Lisa Fernández, softball player. Olympic gold medalist.
- Maritza Correia, athlete. First black Puerto Rican woman in the U.S. Olympic Swimming Team.
