= Almodóvar =

Almodóvar (from Arabic: المدوّر, al-mudawwar, "round, circular (place)") may refer to:

== Places ==
- Almodôvar, Beja, Portugal
- Almodóvar del Campo, Ciudad Real, Spain
- Almodóvar del Pinar, Cuenca, Spain
- Almodóvar del Río, Córdoba, Spain
- Almodóvar Reservoir, Cádiz, Spain

== People ==
- Pedro Almodóvar (born 1949), a Spanish filmmaker
- Agustín Almodóvar (born 1955), a Spanish film producer
- Emilia Almodóvar (born 1981), Spanish politician
- Melina Almodóvar (born 1979), Puerto Rican salsa singer, songwriter, dancer, and entertainer
- Norma Jean Almodovar (born 1951), American author and sex workers' activist

== Other ==
- Duke of Almodóvar del Río, a Spanish nobility title
