= Puerto Rican women in the military =

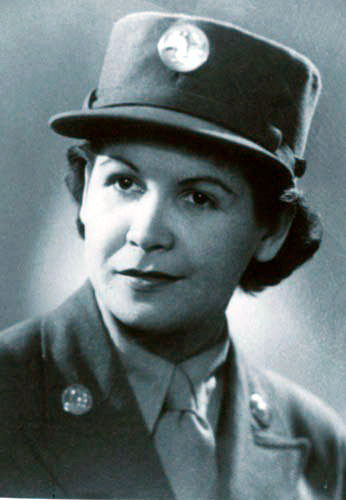
Carmen Contreras-Bozak

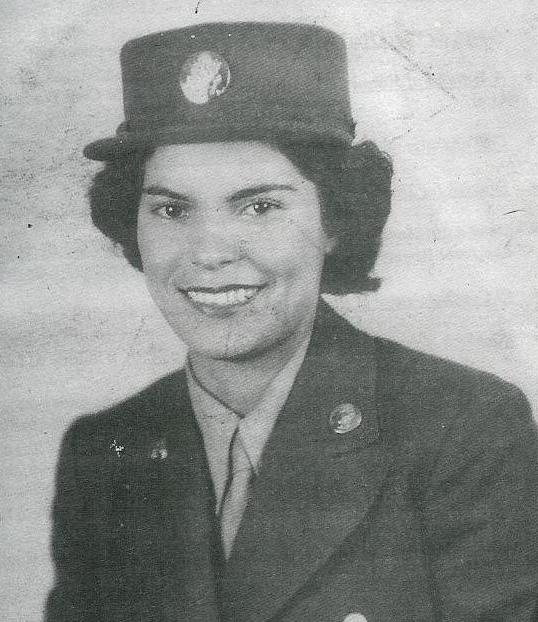
Carmen García Rosado

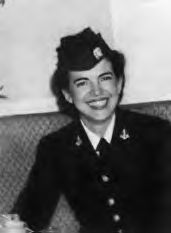
Maria Rodriguez Denton

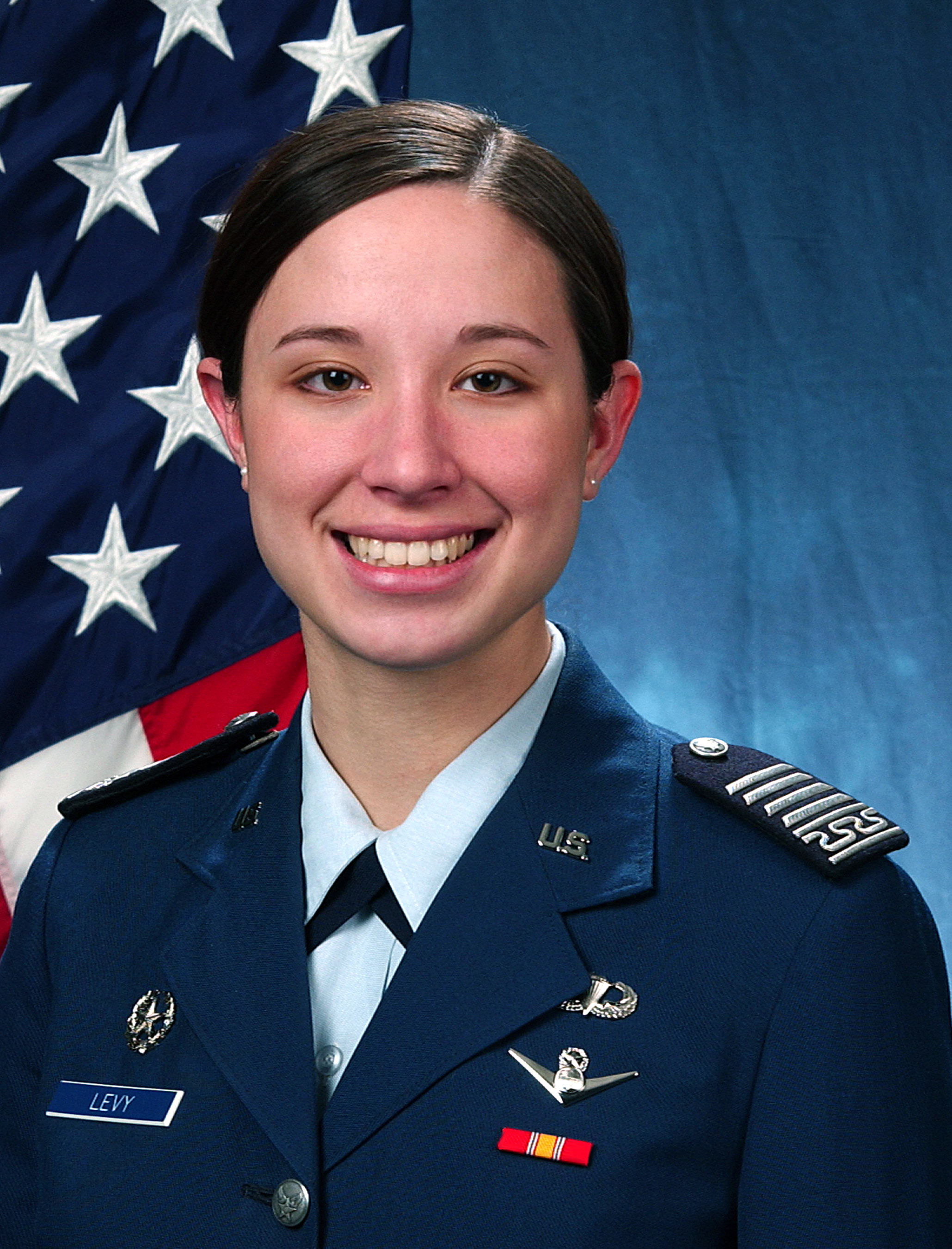
Hila Levy

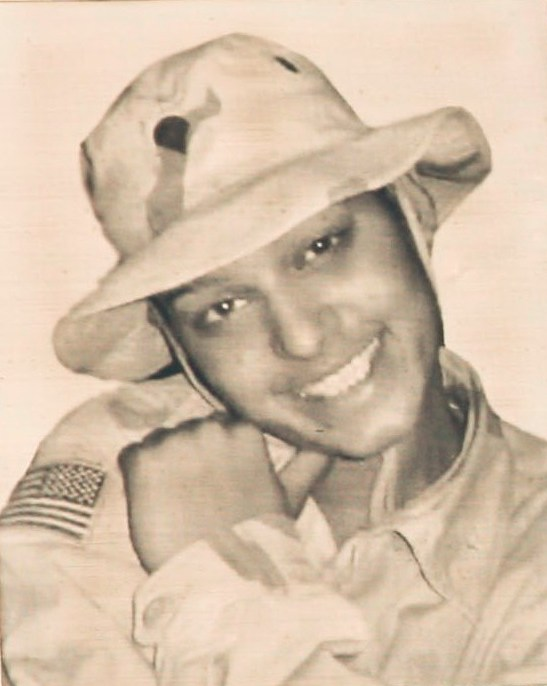
Frances M. Vega

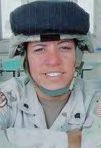
Aleina Ramirez Gonzalez

This is a brief account of some the Puerto Rican women who have participated in military actions as members of either a political revolutionary movement or of the Armed Forces of the United States.

== Background ==
When Puerto Rico was a Spanish Colony, Puerto Rican women were commonly known for their roles as mothers and housekeepers. Women's rights were unheard of and their contributions to the islands' society were limited.

However, during the 19th century women in Puerto Rico began to express themselves through their literary work. Among these women was María Bibiana Benítez, Puerto Rico's first woman poet and playwright. In 1832, she published her first poem La Ninfa de Puerto Rico (The Nymph of Puerto Rico) and her niece, Alejandrina Benitez de Gautier, whose own Aguinaldo Puertorriqueño (Ode to Puerto Rico) would be published in 1843, recognized her as one of the island's great poets.

During the 20th century, some of the women in the island became active as union organizers, such as Luisa Capetillo and involved in politics, as was the case of Felisa Rincón de Gautier.

Even though women in the past had actively participated in the revolt against Spain, it wouldn't be until the United States entered World War II that the military would open its doors to Puerto Rican women.

== La Rogativa ==
According to a Puerto Rican legend, British troops were laying siege to San Juan, Puerto Rico on the night of April 30, 1797. The townswomen, led by a bishop, formed a rogativa (prayer procession) and marched throughout the streets of the city - singing hymns, carrying torches, and praying for the deliverance of the city.

Outside the walls, particularly from the sea, the British navy mistook this torch-lit religious parade for the arrival of Spanish reinforcements. When morning arrived, the British were gone from the island, and the city was saved from a possible invasion.

Four statues sculpted by Lindsay Daen, in the Plazuela de la Rogativa (Rogativa Plaza) in Old San Juan, pay tribute to the bishop and townswomen who participated in La Rogativa.

== Revolt against Spain ==
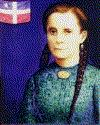
Mariana Bracetti

The first Puerto Rican woman to become an Independentista, who struggled for Puerto Rico's independence from Spanish colonialism, was María de las Mercedes Barbudo. Joining forces with the Venezuelan government, under the leadership of Simon Bolivar, Barbudo organized an insurrection against the Spaniards in Puerto Rico. However, her plans were discovered by the Spanish authorities—she was arrested and exiled from Puerto Rico, never to return.

Puerto Rico witnessed other slave revolts and calls for independence from Spain, but none compared to what became known as El Grito de Lares. This was organized by a group of prominent Puerto Ricans led by Dr. Ramón Emeterio Betances and Segundo Ruiz Belvis. Hundreds of men and women—and even slaves—participated in the uprising.
Of all the women who participated in the revolt, two became part of Puerto Rican legend and lore:

Lola Rodríguez de Tio believed in equal rights for women, the abolition of slavery, and she actively participated in the Puerto Rican Independence Movement. Inspired by Ramón Emeterio Betances's quest for Puerto Rican independence and by the Grito de Lares, she wrote the lyrics to the national anthem of Puerto Rico, La Borinqueña.

Mariana Bracetti, also known as Brazo de Oro (Golden Arm), was the sister-in-law of revolution leader Manuel Rojas. Bracetti knitted the first Puerto Rican flag: the Lares Revolutionary Flag, taking into consideration suggestions made by Betances. Upon the failure of the revolution, Bracetti was imprisoned in Arecibo along with the other survivors, and later released.

== World War I ==
Spain ceded Puerto Rico to the United States in accordance with the agreement reached in the 1898 Treaty of Paris, which officially ended the Spanish–American War. On March 2, 1917, with the advent of World War I, U.S. citizenship was imposed on Puerto Ricans as a result of the passage if the Jones–Shafroth Act (the Puerto Rican House of Delegates rejected US citizenship). Two months later, when Congress passed the Selective Service Act, conscription was extended to the island. Those who were eligible, with the exception of women, were expected to serve in the military. About 20,000 Puerto Rican men were drafted during World War I.

By 1918, the U.S. Army Medical Corps realized there was a shortage of medical anesthesiologists, a low-salary specialty required in military operating rooms. Therefore, the Army reluctantly began hiring women physicians as civilian contract employees. One of the first civilian doctors contracted by the Army was a Puerto Rican woman, who despite the fact that she was not an active member of the military, contributed with her professional skills to the war effort.

Dr. Dolores Piñero, born in San Juan, Puerto Rico, was the first Puerto Rican woman doctor to serve in the Army under contract. In 1913, Dr. Piñero had earned her medical degree from the College of Physicians and Surgeons in Boston, Massachusetts. She set up her medical and anesthesia practice in what was then the town of Río Piedras (it is now a section of San Juan). Upon the outbreak of World War I, she applied for a contract surgeon position, only to be turned down. After writing a letter to the Army Surgeon General in Washington, D.C. explaining her intentions, she received a telegram ordering her to report to Camp Las Casas at Santurce, Puerto Rico. In October 1918, she signed her contract with the Army.

Piñero was reassigned to the Army General Hospital of Fort Brooke, located in the former Ballajá Barracks (in the grounds of the Fort San Felipe del Morro) in Old San Juan. There she worked as an anesthesiologist during the mornings, and in the laboratory during the afternoons. Piñero and four male colleagues received orders to open a 400-bed hospital in Ponce, Puerto Rico, to care for the patients who had been infected with influenza, known also as "the Spanish flu". Among the nurses who served in Ponce with Piñero was Rosa A. González, a registered nurse who authored The Nurses Medical Dictionary. The Spanish flu had swept through Army camps and training posts around the world, infecting one quarter of all soldiers and killing more than 55,000 American troops. After the flu epidemic ended, Piñero was ordered back to the Army base hospital at San Juan.

== World War II ==
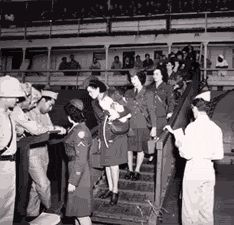
Puerto Rican members of the WAC's.

When the United States entered World War II, the military was in need of nurses. Puerto Rican nurses wanted to volunteer for service, however they were not accepted into the Army or Navy Nurse Corps. As a result, many of the island's women work force migrated to the mainland U.S. to work in the factories which produced military equipment.

In 1944, the Army sent recruiters to the island to recruit no more than 200 women for the Women's Army Corps (WAC). Over 1,000 applications were received for the unit which was to be composed of only 200 women. The Puerto Rican WAC unit, Company 6, 2nd Battalion, 21st Regiment of the Women's Army Auxiliary Corps, a segregated Hispanic unit, was assigned to the New York Port of Embarkation, after their basic training at Fort Oglethorpe, Georgia. They were assigned to work in military offices which planned the shipment of troops around the world.

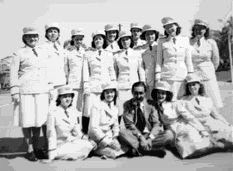
Puerto Rican Army nurses, 296th Station Hospital, Camp Tortuguero, Vega Baja, PR.

Among them was PFC Carmen García Rosado, who in 2006, authored and published a book titled Las WACS: Participacion de la Mujer Boricua en la Segunda Guerra Mundial (The WACs: Participation of Puerto Rican Women in the Second World War), the first book to document the experiences of the first 200 Puerto Rican women who participated in said conflict.

According to García Rosado, one of the principal hardships endured by Puerto Rican military women was racial discrimination, which was rampant throughout the U.S. at the time.

That same year the Army Nurse Corps (ANC) decided to accept Puerto Rican nurses. Thirteen women submitted applications, were interviewed, underwent physical examinations, and were accepted into the ANC. Eight of these nurses were assigned to the Army Post at San Juan, where they were valued for their bilingual abilities. Five nurses were assigned to work at the hospital at Camp Tortuguero, Puerto Rico.

The Navy also recruited a small number of Puerto Rican women as members of the Navy Women's Reserve known as WAVES (Women Accepted for Volunteer Emergency Service) during World War II. Among the women who served in the military and distinguished themselves were:

Tech4 Carmen Contreras-Bozak (1919 – 2017) who was born in Cayey, Puerto Rico, was the first Hispanic to serve in the U.S. Women's Army Corps as an interpreter, and in numerous administrative positions. She arrived in Northern Africa on January 27, 1943, and rendered overseas duties in Algiers within General Dwight D. Eisenhower's theatre headquarters. Her responsibilities included the transmission of encoded messages to the battlefield.

Second Lieutenant Carmen Lozano Dumler (1921 - 2015) who was born in San Juan, was one of the first Puerto Rican women to become a United States Army officer. In 1945, Lozano Dumler was assigned to the 359th Station Hospital of Ft. Read, Trinidad and Tobago, British West Indies, where she attended wounded soldiers who had returned from Normandy, France.

Second Lieutenant Carmen Vazquez Rivera who was born February 15, 1921, in Cidra, Puerto Rico. Served in the United States Army as Head Nurse of the Orthopedic Department at Fort Brooke in San Juan with the rank of Second Lieutenant. Later served in the United States Air Force during the Korean War with the rank of First Lieutenant. Also became wife and widow of prominent Puerto Rican politician Dr. Leopoldo Figueroa. Received WWII Victory Medal, the American Theater Campaign Medal, and the Overseas Service Bars for her service in WWII and later received renewed recognition as a centenarian.

Lieutenant Junior Grade Maria Rodriguez Denton (United States Navy), born June 14, 1909, in the town of Guanica, Puerto Rico, was the first woman from Puerto Rico who became an officer in the United States Navy as member of the WAVES. The Navy assigned Denton as a library assistant at the Cable and Censorship Office in New York City. It was Lt. Denton who forwarded the news (through channels) to President Harry S. Truman that the war had ended.

Sylvia Rexach. one of Puerto Rico's greatest composers of boleros, dropped-out of the University of Puerto Rico in 1942 and joined the U.S. Women's Army Corps where she served as an office clerk. She served in the military until 1945, when she was honorably discharged.

Marie Teresa Rios was a writer of Puerto Rican descent who also served in World War II. Rios is the mother of Medal of Honor recipient Capt. Humbert Roque Versace and author of The Fifteenth Pelican, which was the basis for the 1960s television sitcom "The Flying Nun." She drove Army trucks and buses, and also served as a pilot for the Civil Air Patrol. Rios Versace wrote and edited for newspapers in Guam, Germany, Wisconsin, and South Dakota, and the publications Star & Stripes and Gannett.

== Revolt against the United States ==
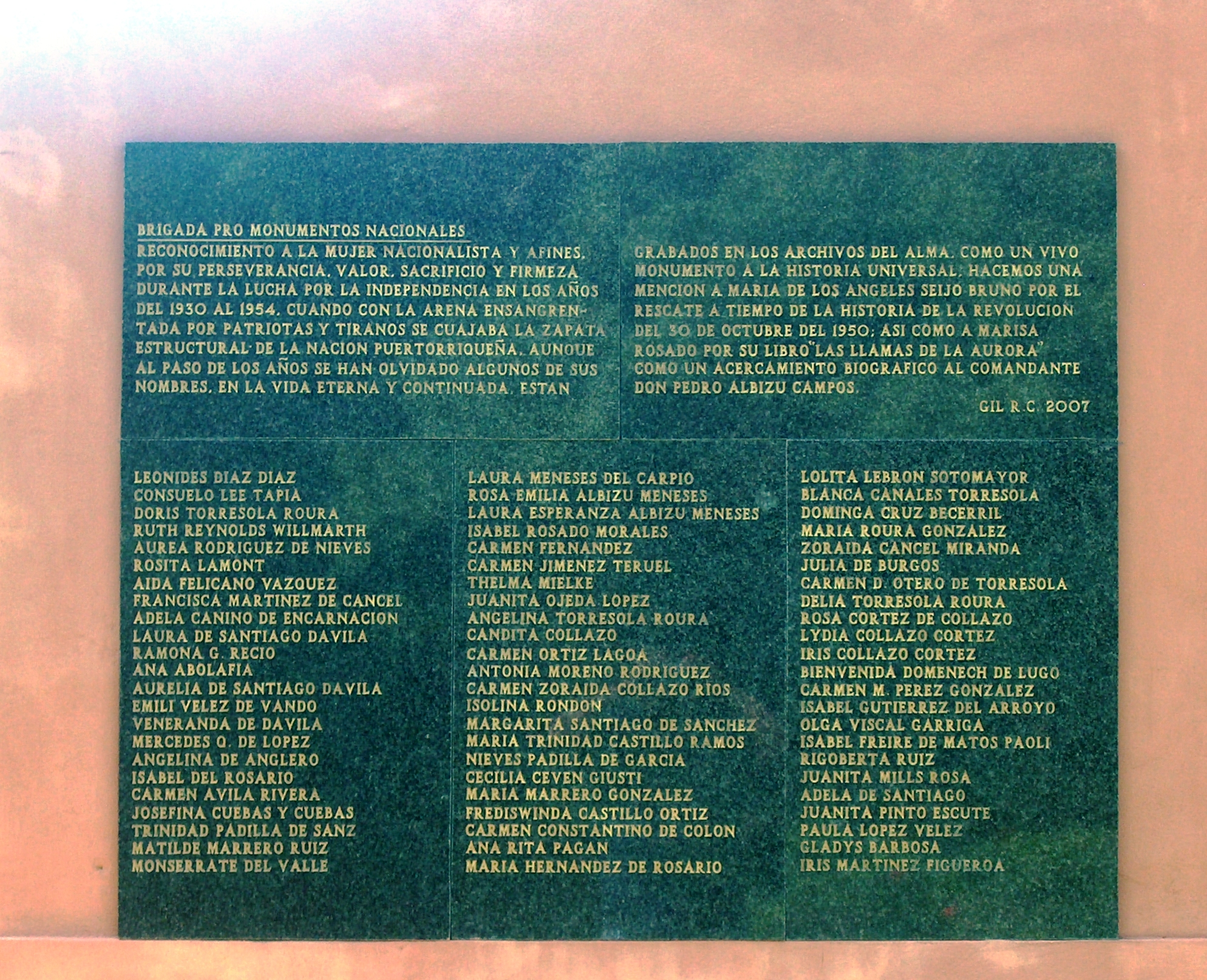
Plaque honoring the women of the Puerto Rican Nationalist Party

The Puerto Rican Nationalist Party, organized on September 17, 1922, became the largest independence group in Puerto Rico by the 1930s. Under the leadership of Dr. Pedro Albizu Campos, the party opted against electoral participation and advocated violent revolution. The women's branch of the Puerto Rican Nationalist Party was called the Daughters of Freedom. Some of the militants of this organization included Julia de Burgos, considered by many as the greatest Puerto Rican poet.

Certain dramatic and violent confrontations during the 1930s, in which the Nationalist Party partisans were involved, led to the call for an uprising against the United States and the eventual attack of the United States House of Representatives of the 1950s.

One of the worst incidents was the Ponce massacre on March 21, 1937, when police officers fired upon Nationalists who were participating in a peaceful demonstration. About 100 were wounded and nineteen were killed, among the dead was one woman Maria Hernandez del Rosario and a seven-year-old child, Georgina Maldonado.

On October 30, 1950, the Nationalist Party called for a revolt against the United States and uprisings, known as the Puerto Rican Nationalist Party Revolts of the 1950s, were held in the towns of Ponce, Mayagüez, Naranjito, Arecibo, Utuado, San Juan, and most notably in Jayuya which became known as the Jayuya Uprising. Various women who were members of the Nationalist Party, but who did not participate in the revolts were arrested. Among them Isabel Rosado, a social worker, was falsely accused by the US Government in participating in the revolts. Dr. Olga Viscal Garriga, a student leader and spokesperson of the Puerto Rican Nationalist Party's branch in Río Piedras, was also falsely accused.

The military intervened and the revolts came to an end after three days on November 2. Two of the most notable women, who bore arms against the United States, were Blanca Canales and Lolita Lebrón.

Blanca Canales is best known for leading the Jayuya Revolt. Canales led her group to the town's plaza where she raised the Puerto Rican flag and declared Puerto Rico to be a Republic. She was arrested and accused of killing a police officer and wounding three others. She was also accused of burning down the local post office. She was sentenced to life imprisonment plus sixty years of jail. In 1967, Canales was given a full pardon by Puerto Rican Governor Roberto Sanchez Vilella.

Lolita Lebrón was the leader of a group of nationalists who attacked the United States House of Representatives in 1954. Lebrón's mission was to bring world attention to Puerto Rico's independence cause. When Lebrón's group reached the visitor's gallery above the chamber in the House, she stood up and shouted "¡Viva Puerto Rico Libre!" ("Long live a Free Puerto Rico!") and unfurled a Puerto Rican flag. Then the group opened fire with automatic pistols. A legend claims that Lebrón fired her shots at the ceiling and missed. In 1979, under international pressure, President Jimmy Carter pardoned Lolita Lebrón and two members of her group, Irving Flores and Rafael Cancel Miranda.

Rosa Collazo was the treasurer of the New York City branch of the Puerto Rican Nationalist Party. She was the wife of Oscar Collazo one of two Nationalists who attacked Blair House in 1950 in an attempt to kill President Harry Truman. She was accused by the FBI of assisting Lolita Lebron, and Lebron's comrades in their assault on the United States House of Representatives. She was charged on both occasions with complicity in a conspiracy to overthrow the United States Government and imprisoned because of her political beliefs.

== 1950s to 1990s ==
After World War II, the Department of Defense began a series of sustained personnel reductions. This also applied to the women's military auxiliary units such as the Women's Army Corps, The Navy's WAVES (Women Accepted for Volunteer Emergency Service) and the Women Airforce Service Pilots (WASPs). However, the Korean War and the Vietnam War produced a demand for the services of these women. Throughout the 1950s and 1960s, Puerto Rican women continued to volunteer for military service.

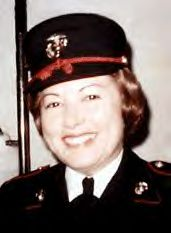
CWO3 Rose Franco

CWO3 Rose Franco, born January 22, 1934, in Guánica, Puerto Rico, was the first Puerto Rican woman to become a Chief Warrant Officer in the U.S. Marine Corps. With the outbreak of the Korean War, Rose surprised her family by announcing that she was leaving college to join the United States Marine Corps. In 1965, Rose was named Administrative Assistant to the Secretary of the Navy Paul Henry Nitze by the administration of President Lyndon B. Johnson.

1st Lieutenant Gloria Esparra Petersen, born May 1, 1927, in the town Barranquitas, Puerto Rico, was an Army nurse at Walter Reed Army Hospital in Washington, D.C., during the Korean War.

Captain Julia Benitez Aviles, (January 28, 1912 – January 15, 1978) born in Orocovis, Puerto Rico, was the first Puerto Rican servicewoman to obtain the rank of captain. She joined the Army Nurse Corps in 1950 and served in Occupation Germany; Washington, D.C.; Texas; and Puerto Rico as a nurse anesthetist, retiring in 1964.

Lieutenant Nilda Carrulas Cedero Fuertes, born in Toa Baja, Puerto Rico, joined the Army Nurse Corps in 1953, serving on active duty until 1964. She then joined the Reserves, where she served until 1990. Among her assignments in the military was teaching the latest nursing techniques to Nicaraguan Army nurses while on temporary duty (TDY) there for six months.

== Vietnam War ==
In January 1967, the Pentagon, via a General Order, sent the first group of military women from the Women's Army Corps to Saigon, Vietnam. They all worked under United States Army Vietnam. Amongst that first group were three Puerto Rican Women; Reina Monte from Brooklyn, New York, Rosario Bermudez from Lorain, Ohio, and Juana Christina Felix from the Bronx, New York. These three Puerto Rican Women served from 1967 to 1968. More Puerto Rican women continued to serve in Vietnam; among them were Sonia Gonzalez, and Nora Lebron who are both currently living in Puerto Rico.

The WAC was dis-established in 1978. Since then, women in the U.S. Army and other branches of the military have served in the same units as men but do not have combat duties.

In 1984, then-cadet Michelle Fraley became the first Puerto Rican woman to graduate from West Point Military Academy. Fraley would rise up to Colonel and become the Chief of Staff for the Army Network Enterprise Technology Command.

== 21st century ==
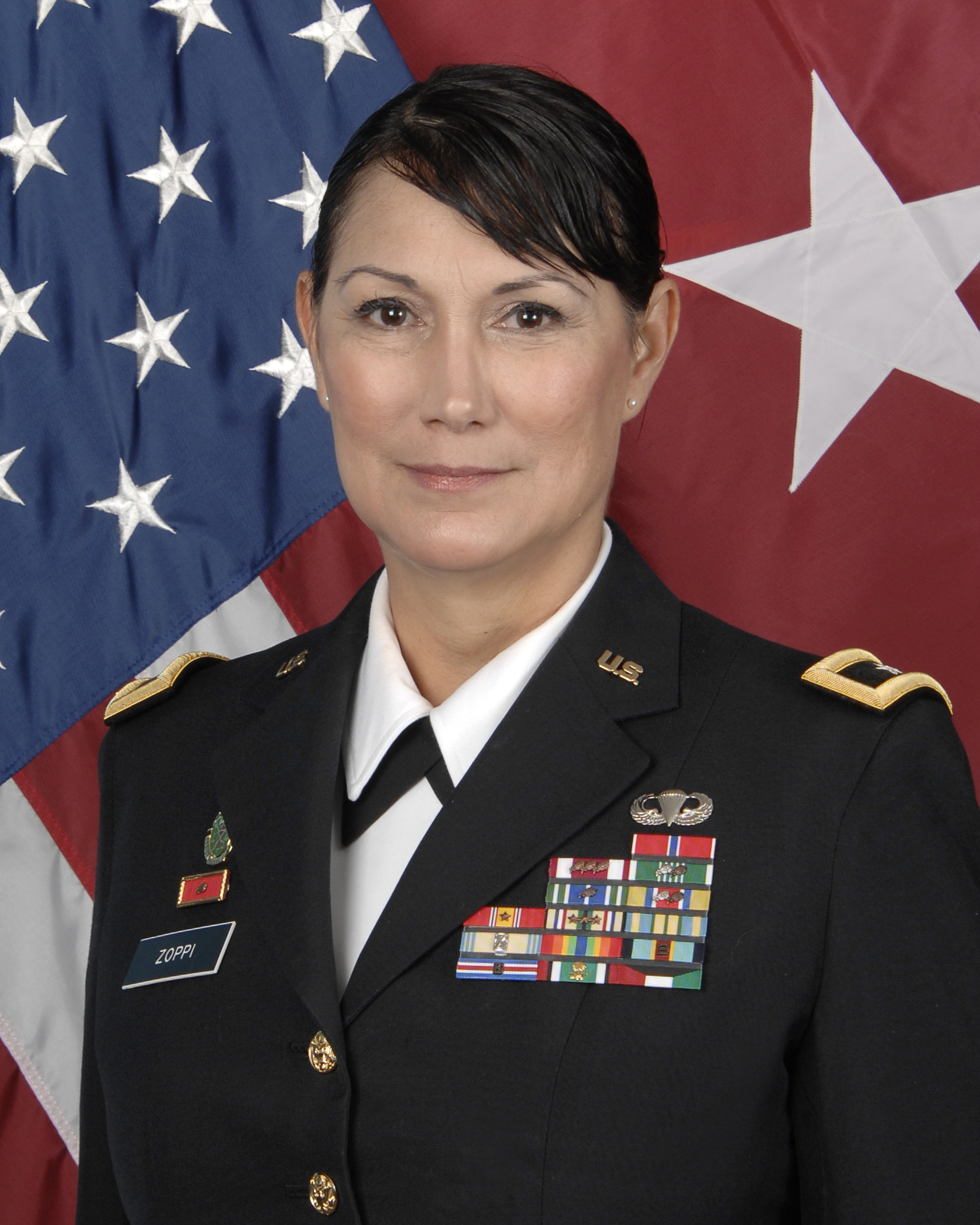
Brigadier General Irene M. Zoppi

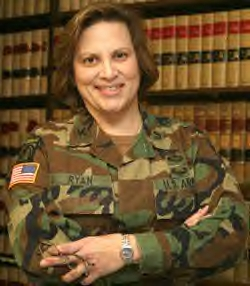
Colonel Maritza Sáenz Ryan

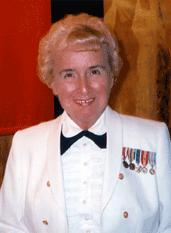
Captain Haydee Javier Kimmich

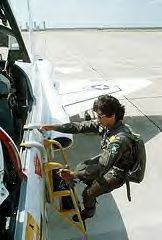
Then Lieutenant Custodio climbing down from the cockpit of a T-38

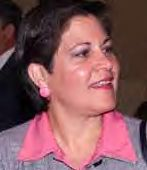
Capt. Linda Garcia Cubero, the first Hispanic woman to graduate from any service academy

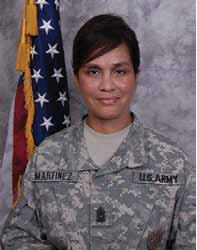
Command Sergeant Major María V. Martínez

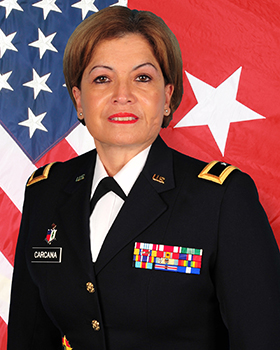
Major General Marta Carcana

Changes within the policy and military structure of the U.S. armed forces helped expand the participation and roles for women in the military, among these the establishment of the All-Volunteer Force in the 1970s. Puerto Rican women and women of Puerto Rican descent have continued to join the Armed Forces, and some have even made the military a career.

Colonel Maritza Sáenz Ryan (U.S. Army) is the head of the Department of Law at the United States Military Academy. She is the first woman and first Hispanic (Puerto Rican father and Spanish mother) West Point graduate to serve as an academic department head. She also has the distinction of being the most senior-ranking Hispanic Judge Advocate. Sáenz Ryan has been instrumental in raising awareness of the inequity and impracticality of the Combat Exclusion Policy, which restricts women's roles and opportunities in the military regardless of talent or ability.

Colonel Maria Zumwalt (U. S. Army) from Bayamon, was named commander of the 48th Chemical Brigade effective June 15, 2011.

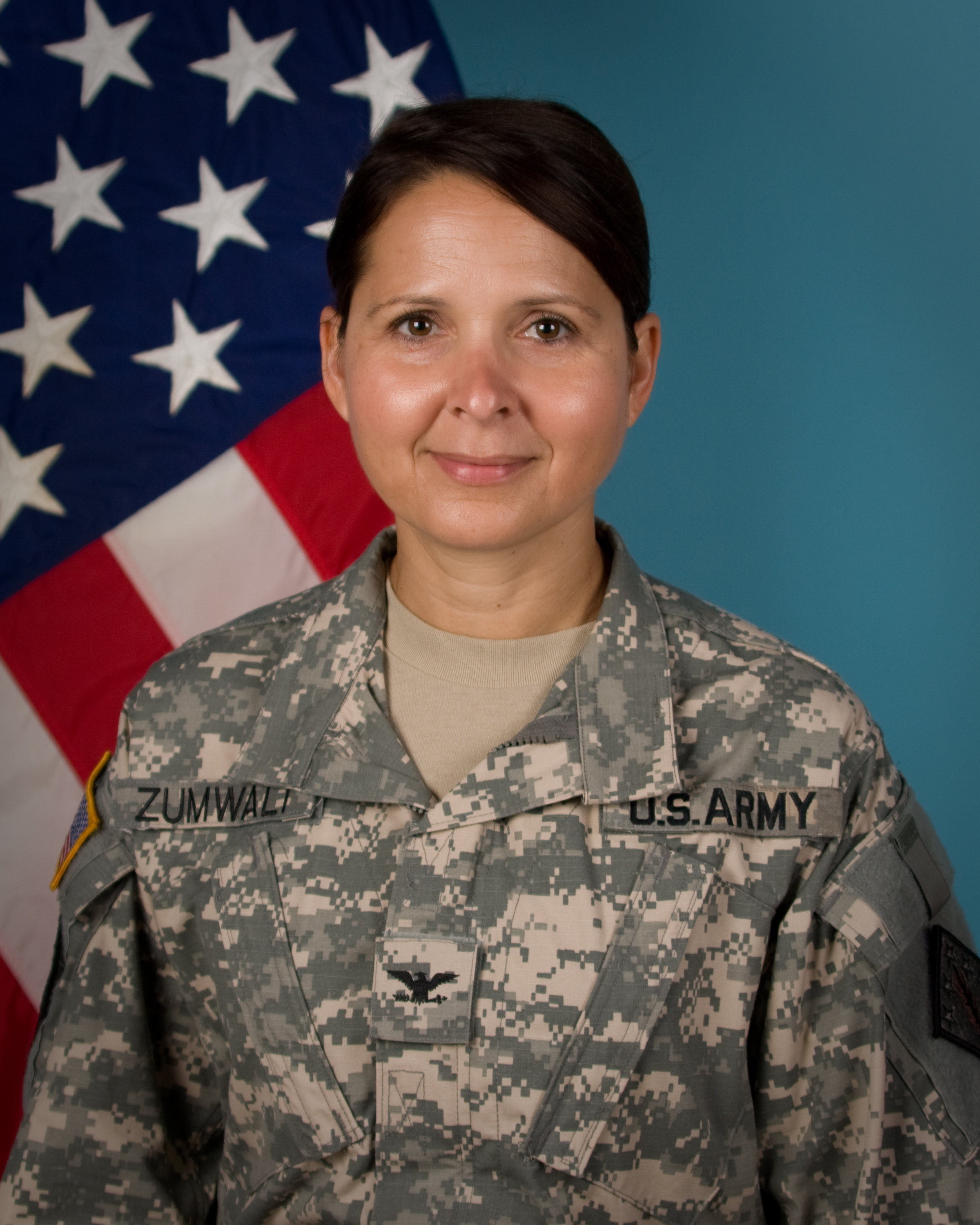
Colonel Maria Zumwalt

Captain Haydee Javier Kimmich (U.S. Navy) from Cabo Rojo, Puerto Rico, was the highest-ranking Hispanic female in the Navy. The naval rank of Captain is the equivalent of Colonel in the other US armed forces. Kimmich was assigned as the Chief of Orthopedics at the Navy Medical Center in Bethesda and reorganized their Reservist Department during Operation Desert Storm. In 1998, she was selected as the woman of the year in Puerto Rico.

Lieutenant Colonel Olga E. Custodio (USAF) became the first female Hispanic U.S. military pilot. She holds the distinction of being first Latina to complete U.S. Air Force military pilot training. Upon retiring from the military, she became the first Latina commercial airline captain.

Major Sonia Roca born December 4, 1955, in San Juan, was the first Hispanic female officer to attend the Command and General Staff Officer Course at the Army's School of the Americas.

Major Hila Levy was born in Guaynabo, Puerto Rico. She was raised in Guaynabo in a military family; her father, Ramon, was a captain in the U.S. Army Corps of Engineers. She enrolled in flying school at age 16 and obtained her license within a year. She enrolled in the United States Air Force Academy in 2004. In 2008, she was the first resident of Puerto Rico to become a Rhodes scholar. As a Cadet in the U.S. Air Force Academy, she was the top graduate, earning the Outstanding Cadet in the Order of Graduation Award, and placement on the 100-year Honor Roll. She has earned a BS in Biology, three master's degrees (historical research and biology from the University of Oxford, and environmental planning and management from Johns Hopkins University) and a PhD in zoology from the University of Oxford. She serves in the 352nd Special Operations Wing, studies penguins in the Antarctic up to four months per year, and is an intelligence officer at the Joint Reserve Intelligence Support Element, Royal Air Force Molesworth, UK. She has also participated in triathlons, marathons and cycling competitions, and serves in veteran support organizations.

Captain Linda Garcia Cubero was the first Hispanic woman graduate of the Air Force Academy in 1980, when the first class with women graduated. She is of Mexican-American and Puerto Rican heritage.

Command Sergeant Major María V. Martínez was the first Puerto Rican female to reach said rank in the U.S. Army. She serves as Senior Enlisted Advisor to the Director of the Army Diversity Office in the Pentagon, Washington D.C.

=== Operations Desert Shield and Desert Storm ===
Puerto Rican servicewomen have served in Operations Desert Shield and Desert Storm. They were among the 41,000 women who participated in both military operations. They also served in the battlefields of Afghanistan and Iraq.

Brigadier General Irene M. Zoppi also known as "RAMBA," was born in Canóvanas, Puerto Rico. According to the U.S. Army, she is "the first Puerto Rican woman promoted to the rank of general in the U.S. Army Reserve." She was deployed to Kuwait, Iraq, and Saudi Arabia with the 3rd Armored Division as a Military Intelligence Officer. She was one of few Latino women, who served during Desert Shield/Storm War in a Tank Division. She is currently the Deputy Commanding General – Support under the 200th Military Police Command at Fort Meade, Maryland. Zoppi is a Bronze Star Medal Recipient. According to the U.S. Army Reserve, "Brig. Gen. Zoppi's awards and decorations include: Bronze Star Medal, Meritorious Service Medal (with 3 oak leaf clusters), Army Commendation Medal (with 6 oak leaf clusters), Southwest Asia Service Medal (with 3 bronze stars), Kuwait Liberation Medal (Kingdom of Saudi Arabia), Kuwait Liberation Medal (Government of Kuwait) and U.S. Army Parachutist Badge. Brig. Gen. Zoppi also received the Military Intelligence Excellence Knowlton Award in 2013."

== Deaths ==
As of July 2007, five Puerto Rican female soldiers have died while serving in the armed forces of the United States. Four deaths were combat-related and one was during a training exercise. They were:

SPC Frances M. Vega (September 2, 1983 – November 2, 2003) was born in San Francisco, California, and graduated from Antilles High School. Her grandfather, father and uncle had served in the U.S. military. Vega was deployed to Iraq in what is known as the war on terrorism, and became the first female soldier of Puerto Rican descent to die in a combat zone when on November 2, 2003, a surface-to-air missile was fired by insurgents in Al Fallujah and hit the U.S. transport helicopter (Chinook) she was in. Vega was one of 16 soldiers who died in the Chinook crash. She was buried with full military honors and posthumously awarded a Bronze Star for bravery and a Purple Heart. An Army Post Office in Iraq was named in her honor, and a sign from the post office was moved to the U.S. Army Adjutant General's Corps Museum in 2012. One of the main gates at the Fort Buchanan military installation is also named in her honor, with a plaque that includes, "Specialist Frances M. Vega epitomizes the character and patriotism of the countless American Soldiers who have answered the call to defend freedom."

SPC Lizbeth Robles (April 4, 1973 – March 1, 2005), born in Vega Baja, Puerto Rico, was the first female soldier born in Puerto Rico to die in the war on terrorism. She was assigned to 360th Transportation Company, 68th Corps Support Battalion, 43rd Area Support Group. SPC Robles volunteered for the 43rd Area Support Group, which rode in convoys to secure dangerous roadways for the delivery of fuel. On February 28, 2005, SPC Robles and Sgt. Julio Negron sustained injuries after riding in a Humvee that flipped over by the town of Baiji, Iraq. Sgt. Negron died on February 28, and SPC Robles died on March 1 at the 228th Combat Support Hospital in Tikrit due to her injuries.

SPC Aleina Ramirez Gonzalez (1972 – April 15, 2005) born in the town of Hormigueros, Puerto Rico, died in Tikrit, Iraq, when a mortar struck her forward operating base.

Captain Maria Ines Ortiz (1967 – July 10, 2007), born in Camden, New Jersey, was the first Hispanic nurse (Puerto Rican descent) to die in combat and first Army nurse to die in Iraq. She was killed by shrapnel from a mortar attack in the Baghdad Green Zone. She had volunteered for service in Iraq.

The names of four of these women, along with the other Puerto Ricans who have perished in Afghanistan and Iraq, were engraved in El Monumento de la Recordación (The Monument of Remembrance), which is dedicated to Puerto Rico's fallen soldiers and situated in front of the Capitol Building in San Juan, Puerto Rico. This monument was unveiled by Puerto Rico Senate President Kenneth McClintock and PR National Guard Adjutant General Col. David Carrión on Memorial Day, 2007.

SPC Hilda I. Ortiz Clayton (May 21, 1991 – July 2, 2013) is the first Puerto Rican female to die in a non-combat related accident. Clayton was an Army combat photographer who was killed in 2013 when a mortar exploded during an Afghan training exercise; she was able to photograph the explosion that killed her and four Afghan soldiers. The 55th Signal Company named their annual competitive award for combat camera work "The Spc. Hilda I. Clayton Best Combat Camera (COMCAM) Competition" in her honor

== Adjutant General of the Puerto Rican National Guard ==
In July 2015, Puerto Rico Governor Alejandro Garcia Padilla nominated Colonel Marta Carcana for the position of Adjutant General of the Puerto Rican National Guard, a position which she unofficially held since 2014. On September 4, 2015, she was confirmed as the first Puerto Rican woman to lead the Puerto Rican National Guard and promoted to Major General.

== See also ==
- Military history of Puerto Rico
- Puerto Rican Campaign
- Puerto Ricans in World War I
- Puerto Ricans in World War II
- 65th Infantry Regiment in the Korean War
- Puerto Ricans in the Vietnam War
- History of women in the military
- List of Puerto Rican military personnel
- History of women in Puerto Rico
