= José Ferrer Canales =

Puerto Rican activist (1913–2005)

- Born: September 18, 1913; Santurce, Puerto Rico
- Died: July 20, 2005 (aged 91); Hato Rey, Puerto Rico
- Occupations: educator, writer and a pro-independence political activist.

José Ferrer Canales (September 18, 1913 – July 20, 2005) was an educator, writer and a pro-independence political activist.

== Early years ==
Ferrer Canales was born in Santurce, Puerto Rico, into a poor working-class family. He was able to attend school, despite the economic hardships his family faced. He received his elementary education at the Pedro G. Goyco Elementary School and his secondary instruction at Román Baldorioty de Castro School in San Juan. He attended and graduated from the Central Superior High School. The situation was very difficult for him because after school he had to work in order to help support his family.

In 1934, Ferrer Canales enrolled in the University of Puerto Rico. During his university years he met and befriended Dr. Pedro Albizu Campos, leader of the Puerto Rican Nationalist Party. This led to his active participation in the pro-independence movement. In 1937, he earned his bachelor's degree in Arts, graduating magna cum laude. In 1944, Canales earned his master's degree in Arts with his thesis: "Enrique José Varona". He was influenced by the philosophic ideas of Varona, Eugenio María de Hostos and José Martí.

== Educator ==
Ferrer Canales taught Spanish in a high school located in the town of Humacao from 1937 to 1943. After receiving his master's degree, he was hired as a Spanish professor at his alma mater. That same year the university also awarded him a grant to study Spanish and Latin American literature at Columbia University in New York City. In New York he was subject to racial discrimination however, that did not keep him from teaching Spanish at Hunter College.

In 1946, he returned to the island and was offered a position in the department of humanities at the University of Puerto Rico. He was fired in 1948, due to the political unrest spreading throughout Puerto Rico and his pro-independence activism.

== Author ==
In 1949, he left the island and moved to the United States, where he taught in various universities in Louisiana, Texas, and Washington, D.C. Ferrer Canales went to Mexico and enrolled in the National Autonomous University of Mexico, where he earned his doctorate degree in letters in 1952 with his thesis: "Varona, escritor". In 1963, he returned to Puerto Rico, and the University of Puerto Rico once again opened their doors to him. He taught Spanish literature and political history. During this time he befriend Dr. Margot Arce de Vázquez who also served as an inspiration for his writings. He was invited as a quest speaker to many countries, among them the United States, Mexico, Cuba, Brazil, Canada, Ecuador, Peru, Venezuela, Spain, France, Hungary and England.

== Written works ==
Among his works are:

- "Marginalia"(1939)
- "Por nuestra lengua y nuestra soberanía" (1941)
- "Agonía y esperanza de Puerto Rico" (1962)
- "Imagen de Varona" (1964)
- "Regionalism and University" (1965)
- "Acentos cívicos" (1972)
- "Gandhi: evocación del centenario (1972)
- "Asteriscos" (1990)
- "Martí y Hostos" (1991)

== Honors and recognitions ==
Ferrer Canales retired in 1983, however Puerto Rican anthropologist Ricardo Alegría convinced him to come out of retirement and to teach in the Center of Advanced Studies of Puerto Rico and the Caribbean. He also had a column in the daily newspaper El Nuevo Día. Ferrer Canales received many awards and recognitions during his lifetime, among them are the following:

- Professor emeritus of the University of Puerto Rico (1983).
- Honorary professor of the Humanities Faculty of the National Atonomus University Nacional of Santo Domingo (1987).
- Honorary professor of the UPR specializing in Eugenio María de Hostos (1989–1990).
- Journalist Prize from the Institute of Puerto Rican Culture (1990).
- Honorary member of the Cuban Teachers Association (1992).
- Member of the Puerto Rican Academy of the Spanish Language (1992).
- Prize of Honor of the Puerto Rican Athenaeum (1994).
- The National Cultural Medal bestowed on him by the Cuban Minister of Culture (1995).
- Named Humanist of the Year by the Puerto Rican Humanities Foundation (1997).
- The Second International Book Fair of Puerto Rico was dedicated to Canales (1998).

== Final years ==
Ferrer Canales died on July 20, 2005, at the Teachers' Hospital in Hato Rey, Puerto Rico, at the age of 91 and was survived by his wife Ana Hilda Betancourt. He is buried in the Villa Palmeras Cemetery a.k.a. "Cementerio Municipal San Jose de Villa Palmeras" which is located in Avenida (Avenue) Eduardo Conde, Villa Palmeras, Santurce, San Juan, Puerto Rico.

== See also ==
- List of Puerto Ricans
- Puerto Rican Nationalist Party
- French immigration to Puerto Rico
