= María Rodríguez Denton =

María Luisa Rodríguez Denton
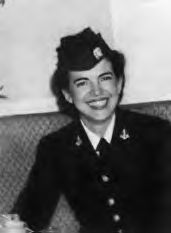
- Born: June 14, 1909; Guanica, Puerto Rico
- Died: 1995 (aged 85–86)
- Military career
- Branch: U.S. Navy WAVES
- Service years: 1944-1948
- Rank: Lieutenant Junior Grade

María Luisa Rodríguez Denton was the first Hispanic woman to be commissioned an officer in the United States Navy WAVES.

== Early life ==
Maria Rodriguez was born 14 June 1909 in Guánica, Puerto Rico. She graduated from the University of Puerto Rico in 1937 with and associate degree in education, and Columbia University School of Library Science in 1938 with a professional certification in library science. She worked for the Office of Insular Affairs in San Juan from 1931 to 1941 supervising high school libraries.

== Military career ==
María Rodríguez Denton commissioned in 1944. In 1945, Lieutenant Junior Grade Rodriguez was stationed in New York City on censorship duty monitoring international communications entering and leaving the United States to prevent sensitive information from reaching the enemy. She was on duty in the Cable Censorship Office and put through the message to president Harry Truman that the war had ended.

After the war ended, she was stationed at the U.S. Naval Barracks, Broadway New York as an assistant recreation officer and Spanish teacher. She returned to Puerto Rico in January 1946 to work in the U.S. Army Antilles Department personnel division. After her military service She went to work to the San Juan Veterans Administration Hospital in July 1946 as the Chief Librarian for hospitalized veterans in Puerto Rico. In 1948, she was trained as a personnel officer updating reserve officer's records.

== Awards and decorations ==
She was awarded the American Campaign Medal and the World War II Victory Medal.
