= Emilia Almodóvar =

Spanish politician (born 1981)

Member of the Congress of Deputies
- Incumbent
- Assumed office 19 December 2023
- Preceded by: Begoña García Bernal
- Constituency: Cáceres

Personal details
- Born: 20 February 1981 (age 45)
- Party: Spanish Socialist Workers' Party (since 1999)

Emilia Almodóvar Sánchez (born 20 February 1981) is a Spanish politician serving as a member of the Congress of Deputies since 2023. She has been a member of the Spanish Socialist Workers' Party since 1999.
