= Ivonne Belén =

Puerto Rican filmmaker

- Born: 1955 (age 70–71); San Juan, Puerto Rico
- Occupations: documentary movie director and producer

Notes
- She produced and directed the film "Julia, todo en mi..." (Julia, all in me...) in (2002) with the participation of Oscar winner Benicio del Toro.

Ivonne Belén (born 1955) is a Puerto Rican documentary movie director and producer.

== Early years ==
Belén was born and raised in San Juan, the capital of Puerto Rico, where she received her primary and secondary education. As a child Belén enjoyed setting up improvised plays for her family. Her first experiences with the artistic world was when she participated in her school plays. She was also a talented artist who drew and created cartoon characters.

After graduating from high school, Belén enrolled and attended the University of Puerto Rico where she studied Art and Communications. She worked in an animated cartoon workshop at the same time that she attended the university. In the 1980s, Belén became a professional copywriter and producer.

== Copywriter and producer ==
In 1987, she decided to try her own luck as an independent freelancer. In the 1988 films The Bell and San Juan Story, Belén worked as Production Designer. After this, she undertook the art design for the films:

- La Guagua Aérea (The Air Bus) (1992),
- La Recién Nacida Sangre (The Recently Born Blood) (1992) and
- Shortcut to Paradise (1993).

== Documentary films ==
Belén's first experience of doing a documentary film was in 1992 when she was the Co-Producer and Art Director of Rafael Hernández, Jibarito del Mundo. She then worked on two other documentaries, Adome, la presencia Africana en Puerto Rico (Adome, the African presence in Puerto Rico) (1992) and Reseña de una Vida Util (1995). The experience gained from these documentaries inspired her to form her own film company called The Paradiso Film Company, in which she is the executive producer.

Belén always loved to read, especially poetry; amongst her favorite poets are Mercedes Negrón Muñoz and Julia de Burgos. She decided to make a documentary about the life of Clara Lair and dedicated many years of work and research to this project. Finally in 1996, she produced, directed and wrote the screenplay for the documentary which she titled A Passion named Clara Lair.

Amongst the many awards which this film won were:

- Special mention in the XVII Havana Latin-American Film Festival (1996) in Cuba
- Special mention in the IX San Juan Cinemafest (1997) in Puerto Rico,
- "The Mesquite Award" (1997) in San Antonio, Texas and
- "Best Video Documentary" at the Valdivia International Film & Video Festival (1998) celebrated in Chile.

The success obtained in this film inspired her to pursue her second project - a documentary about the life and work of the late Puerto Rican poet Julia de Burgos. She based her film on the letters that Burgos sent to her sister Consuelo from New York City and Cuba between the years of 1940 to 1953. Finally, with the cooperation of Puerto Rican playwright Luis Rafael Sánchez, she produced and directed the film which she titled "Julia, todo en mi..." (Julia, all in me...) in (2002). Among the actors who participated in the movie are Oscar winner Benicio del Toro, Nydia Caro, Jacobo Morales and singer Danny Rivera.

Belén is also a judge in the Syracuse International Film & Video Festival in New York. This is an international organization that promotes creative and scholarly work in the verbal and visual arts.

== See also ==
- List of Puerto Ricans
- History of women in Puerto Rico
