= Nilita Vientós Gastón =

Puerto Rican educator

- Born: June 5, 1903; San Sebastián, Puerto Rico
- Died: July 10, 1989 (aged 86); Santurce, Puerto Rico
- Education: University of Puerto Rico School of Law (JD)
- Occupations: lawyer, educator, writer and journalist

Notes
- In 1946, Vientós Gastón became the first woman president of the Puerto Rican Athenaeum

Petronila "Nilita" Vientós Gastón (June 5, 1903 – July 10, 1989) was a Puerto Rican educator, writer and journalist, and the first female lawyer to work for the Puerto Rico Department of Justice.

== Early years ==
Vientós Gastón was born in San Sebastián, Puerto Rico, a town located on the western region of Puerto Rico. Her parents moved to Havana, Cuba when she was only a child, where she received her primary education. After living in Cuba for various years, they moved to New York City, where she received her secondary education. In 1923, Vientós Gastón returned to Puerto Rico.

== Academic education ==
She entered the University of Puerto Rico School of Law where she studied law and earned her degree. In 1945, while she was a student, she founded and directed the magazine Asomante. She was granted a scholarship from the Rockefeller Foundation and studied literature at Kenyon College at Gambier, Ohio.

== Professional career ==
When Vientós Gastón returned to Puerto Rico, she was hired by her alma mater to teach literature. She was also hired by the Puerto Rico Department of Justice, becoming the first woman hold this position. She worked as an auxiliary prosecutor general for three decades. Vientós Gastón defended the use of the Spanish language in the courts of Puerto Rico, before the Supreme Court, and won.

Vientós Gastón was a founding member of the Puerto Rican Academy of the Spanish Language. In 1946, Vientós Gastón became the first woman president of the Puerto Rican Athenaeum, a position which she held until 1961. She was also the first president of the PEN Club of Puerto Rico.

== Author ==
Vientós Gastón had a column in the newspaper "El Mundo". In 1956, she published Introducción a Henry James" (Introduction to Henry James) and in 1957 Impresiones de un Viaje (Impressions of a trip). For many years she was editor of the literary journal "Asomante". In 1970, she founded the journal Sin Nombre (Without a Name). She was also the author of Apuntes Sobre Teatro.

== Later years ==
In 1996, the Association of Graduates of the University of Puerto Rico, dedicated the 50th anniversary issue of Asomante to Vientós Gastón and to the memory of Margot Arce de Vázquez. Vientós Gastón died on July 10, 1989, in Santurce, Puerto Rico. She was buried at Santa María Magdalena de Pazzis Cemetery in San Juan, Puerto Rico.

== Legacy ==
The Nilita Vientós Gastón Foundation was founded in 1995 and Vientós Gastón's house was converted into a museum-library. The Foundation together with the Puerto Rican Institute of Culture manages her publications and documents. The Puerto Rican Bar Association annually present the Nilita Vientós Gastón Medal to the person whose principles exemplifies that of Vientós Gastón's. The Bar Association also honored her memory by naming a Hall after her. Giannina Braschi dedicated United States of Banana to Nilita Vientós Gastón.

== See also ==
- First women lawyers around the world
- List of Puerto Ricans
- French immigration to Puerto Rico
- History of women in Puerto Rico
