= Mercedes Negrón Muñoz =

Puerto Rican writer (1895–1973)

- Born: Mercedes Negrón Muñoz; March 8, 1895; Barranquitas, Puerto Rico
- Died: August 26, 1973 (aged 79); San Juan, Puerto Rico
- Education: University of Puerto Rico
- Occupations: Poet, essayist
- Relatives: Luis Muñoz Marín (Cousin)
- Writing career
- Pen name: Hedda Gabler, Clara Lair
- Period: 1916–1950
- Notable work: Arras de Cristal (1937) Tropico Amargo (1950) Mas Allá del Poniente (1950) Obras Poeticas (1961)

Mercedes Negrón Muñoz a.k.a. "Clara Lair" (March 8, 1895 – August 26, 1973), was a Puerto Rican poet and essayist who was considered one of the preeminent feminist and postmodernist female Puerto Rican writers of the 20th century.

== Early life and education ==
Negrón Muñoz was born in Barranquitas, Puerto Rico, into a family which included writers, poets and politicians. Her father was the poet Quintín Negrón and her uncles the poet Jose A. Negrón and poet and statesman Luis Muñoz Rivera. She was also the cousin of Puerto Rico's first elected governor Luis Muñoz Marín. Negrón Muñoz received her primary and secondary education in her hometown and she studied literature in the University of Puerto Rico.

It was during this time that she began to integrate herself in the country's cultural and artistic circles, developing friendships with other prominent writers of the time. One such close friend was the journalist and writer Luis Llorens Torres, who would later refer to Clara Lair as "the Alfonsina Storni of Puerto Rico."" In the first decades of the 20th century, Lair caused great controversy for her liberal and feminist writings, published in the literary magazines Juan Bobo and Idearium between 1916 and 1917, under the pseudonym Hedda Gabler, alluding to the character of Ibsen. She emigrated with her family to the United States in 1918, where her first poems were born. The family returned to Puerto Rico in 1932.

== Career and major works ==
In 1937 she published her first book of poems titled "Arras de Cristal" under the pseudonym Clara Lair, which she would later use throughout her career. It received awards from the Puerto Rican Athenaeum and the Puerto Rican Institute of Culture. A short time later, she would be recognized as an important figure in Latin American literary history by the Puerto Rico Institute of Literature. In 1950 she published two volumes entitled "Trópico Amargo" and "Más allá del Poniente". As of 1959, she began to publish in the Journal of the Institute of Puerto Rican Culture fragments of a fictionalized biography with the title of Memories of an islander that remains unfinished right at the beginning. As a poet Clara Lair inserts herself in the tradition of feminine writing inaugurated by Juana de Ibarbourou, Alfonsina Storni, Delmirab Agustini and Gabriela Mistral within the postmodernism of the first decades of the 20th century and cultivated shortly after in Puerto Rico by Julia de Burgos, a figure influenced largely by Lair herself. Her poetic corpus was characterized by the representation of everyday Puerto Rican scenes through the use of couplets, sonnets, and frequent Alexandrian verses. They were also recurring themes of love, feminists, existentialists, pessimists and erotic.

== Legacy ==
Isabel Cuchí Coll published a book about Negrón Muñoz titled "Dos Poetisas de América: Clara Lair y Julia de Burgos." A docudrama about the life of Negrón Muñoz titled "A Passion Named Clara Lair" was produced and directed by Ivonne Belen in 1996. Puerto Rico has honored her memory by naming a school after her, and in the town of Hormigueros Hogar Clara Lair, Inc., a non-profit organization operated from 1991 to 2016 as a shelter and relief organization for women surviving domestic violence, as well as those who do not have emotional or economic support. Since March 29th, 2000, the street in front of La Rogativa in Old San Juan, near her last place of residence, bears her name. This is thanks to the work of Mr. Mario Negrón Portillo, President of the Fundación Felisa Rincón.

== See also ==
- List of Puerto Rican writers
- List of Puerto Ricans
- Puerto Rican literature
- Puerto Rican Poetry
