= Camila Sagardia =

Puerto Rican model

Camila Sagardia is a model turned actress from San Juan, Puerto Rico. She was born December 13, 1988, in San Juan where she was raised. Camila started her modeling career at age 13 when she did a bathing suit and underwear print campaign for Planell Swimwear/ Planell Intimates. She participated in other print campaigns, but it wasn't until she was 16 that her acting career took center stage.

She played three roles in the stage presentation of "Dead Man Walking" and later was the principal on Grammy winning band's (Black Guayaba) music video. She attended the University of Miami, where she double majored in Motion Pictures and Theatre. In 2011 she played the lead role in "Un Sabor a Miel" (A Taste of Honey) at the Centro de Bellas Artes in Santurce, Puerto Rico. Later on she went to play Aurora in the Colombian mini series, "La Mirada de Sara".

In 2013 she played Patricia in the Venezuela-Puerto Rico co-production of "Pasión de Mil Amores" alongside Manuel "Coco" Sosa and Laura Alemán among others. In 2016 she made a day appearance in "Start Up" as Adam Brody's secretary.

She has participated in several music videos and campaigns for AT&T, MAPFRE, Medalla, Miccosukee Resort and Casino, Marriott Hotel, Puerto Rico Tourism Company, etc.
