= Rose Franco =

U.S. Marine Corps officer (1934–2021)

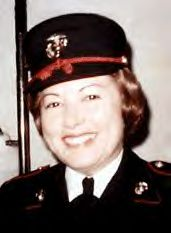
- Born: January 22, 1934; Guánica, Puerto Rico
- Died: October 2, 2021 (aged 87); Fort Lauderdale, Florida, U.S.
- Burial place: Arlington National Cemetery
- Military career
- Allegiance: United States of America
- Branch: United States Marine Corps
- Service years: 1952-1977
- Rank: Chief Warrant Officer 3
- Commands: Administrative Assistant to the Secretary of the Navy
- Awards: Navy Achievement Medal; Marine Corps Good Conduct Medal; National Defense Service Medal

Rose Julia Franco-Gronowetter (January 22, 1934 – October 2, 2021) was a warrant officer in the United States Marine Corps. Originally from Puerto Rico, she was the first Hispanic woman to become a chief warrant officer in the U.S. Marine Corps.

== Early life and education ==
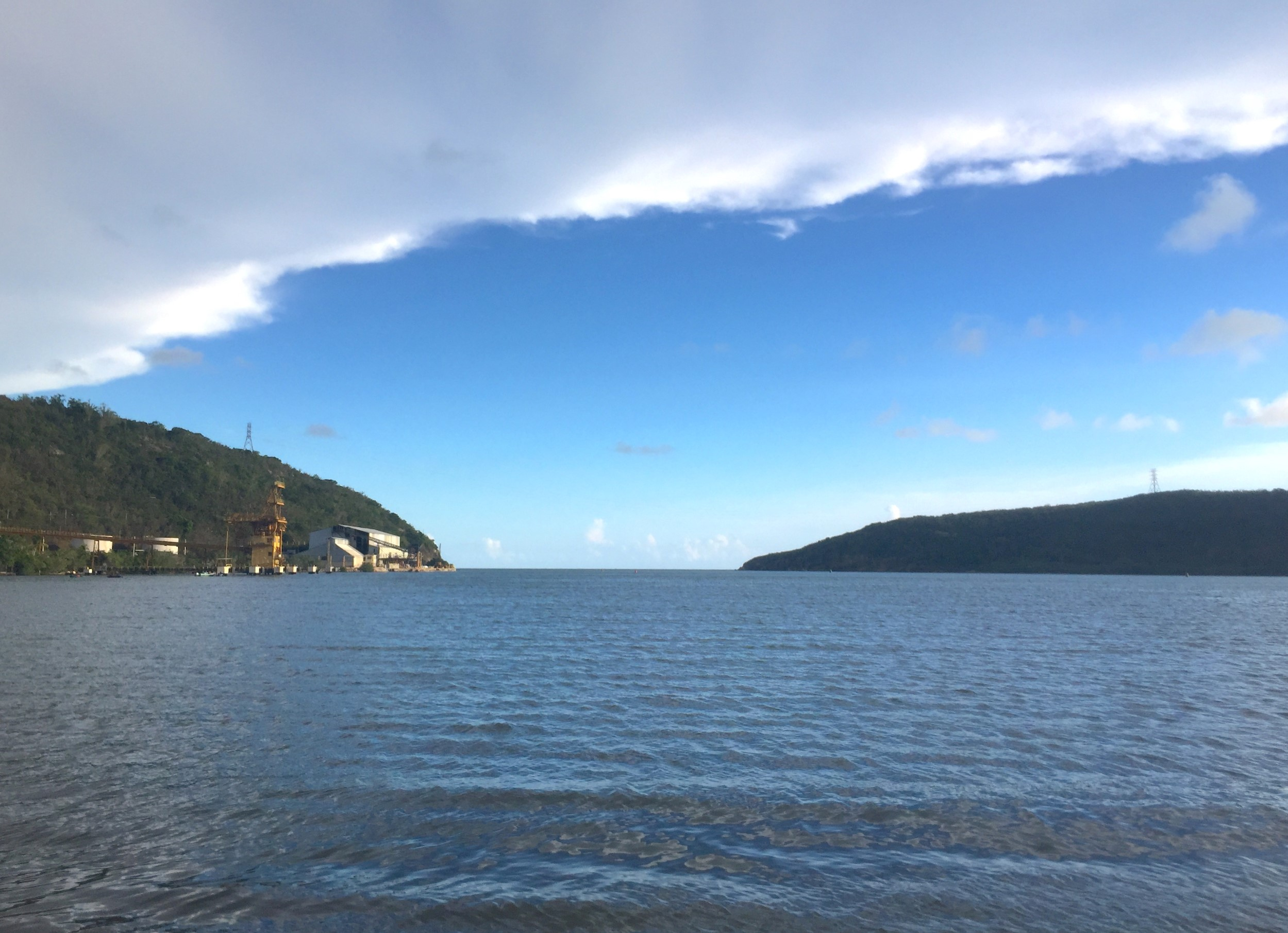
Bahía de Guánica

Franco was born and raised in the barrio Ensenada of Guánica, Puerto Rico, which is located close to the "Bahia de Guánica" (Guánica Bay) in the southwest part of Puerto Rico. Franco, who was born into a poor family, was able to finish her primary and secondary education. Franco went to college for a brief period of time, where she took classes in business administration.

== Career ==
With the outbreak of the Korean War, Franco surprised her family by announcing that she was leaving college to join the United States Marine Corps. Her family protested, because they believed that a women's destiny was to get married and to raise a family as a housewife. Franco, however had her own ideas and felt that it was her patriotic duty to serve in the armed forces. On February 8, 1952, at the age of 20, Franco enlisted and was sent to Camp Lejeune in North Carolina where she underwent basic training. Upon graduation, she was sent to Camp Lejeune for advanced training. After finishing her advanced training, Franco was assigned to the duties of administrative supply assistant at Camp Pendleton in California.

In 1956, she completed her four-year enlistment and returned to Puerto Rico where she went to work for Pan American Airlines. She found her office job in the airline boring and soon she re-enlisted in the Marines. She was assigned to the First Marine Corps District in Garden City, Long Island, New York. During the night she attended Long Island University. After two years there, she was sent to work as an administrator at Marine Corps Recruit Depot Parris Island in Parris Island, South Carolina.

=== Administrative Assistant to the Secretary of the Navy ===
In 1965, Franco was named Administrative Assistant to the Secretary of the Navy, Paul Henry Nitze by the administration of President Lyndon B. Johnson. She was promoted to the rank of Warrant Officer by the recommendation of the Secretary of the Navy. She reported to work in The Pentagon in Washington, D.C. At that time, she was only one of 11 women Warrant Officers in the Marine Corps. Franco held various important positions in The Pentagon during her career.

== Retirement and death ==
Franco retired from the United States Marine Corps in 1977 with the rank of Chief Warrant Officer 3 and returned to Puerto Rico. She died in Fort Lauderdale, Florida, on October 2, 2021, at the age of 87.

== Awards and decorations ==

Navy and Marine Corps Achievement Medal	Marine Corps Good Conduct Medal w/ 3 bronze service stars	National Defense Service Medal w/ 1 bronze service star

Badges:

- Office of the Secretary of Defense Identification Badge

== See also ==
- List of Puerto Ricans
- List of Puerto Rican military personnel
- Puerto Rican women in the military
- Hispanics in the United States Marine Corps
- History of women in Puerto Rico
