= Olga E. Custodio =

United States Air Force officer

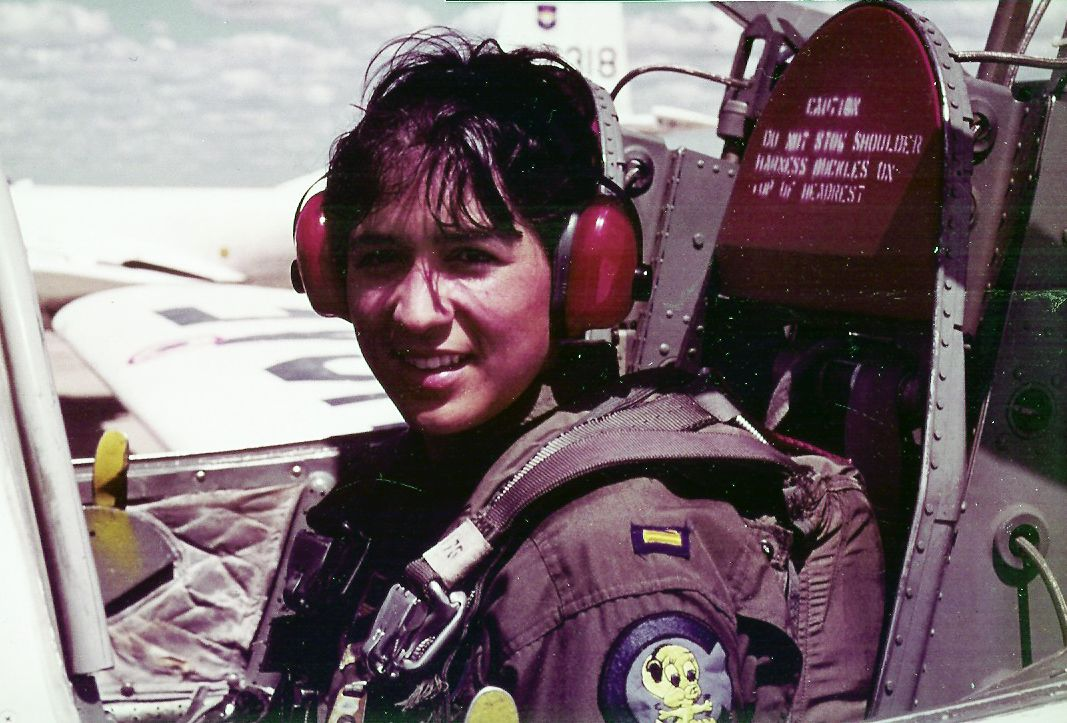
- Born: January 22, 1953 (age 73); San Juan, Puerto Rico
- Military career
- Allegiance: United States of America
- Branch: United States Air Force; Air Force Reserve
- Service years: 1980–2003
- Rank: Lieutenant Colonel
- Other work: American Airlines Pilot - one of the first Hispanic women to become a commercial airline captain

Lieutenant Colonel Olga E. Custodio (Note: Custodio is the surname by marriage.) (born 1953) is a former United States Air Force officer who became the first female Hispanic U.S. military pilot. She was the first Hispanic woman to complete U.S. Air Force military pilot training. Upon retiring from the military, she became the first female Hispanic commercial airline captain of American Airlines.

== Early years ==
Born Olga Esther Nevarez Nieves, in Puerto Rico. Her father, Ismael Nevarez, a sergeant in the United States Army, was often stationed in various countries where the United States has its military installations. Custodio and the rest of the family would accompany him on his overseas assignments. Custodio began her primary education in Taiwan. She also attended schools in New Jersey, Iran and Paraguay.

After her father retired from the Army the family returned to Puerto Rico when she was 15 years old. She graduated high school at age 16, and was immediately accepted into the University of Puerto Rico where she earned a Bachelor of Arts degree. Custodio's father, and all the traveling she did at a young age, were key factors in her choice of career - she decided to join the military. While in college she attempted to join the university's ROTC (Reserve Officer Training Corps), but at the time only men were admitted into the program.

== Military career ==
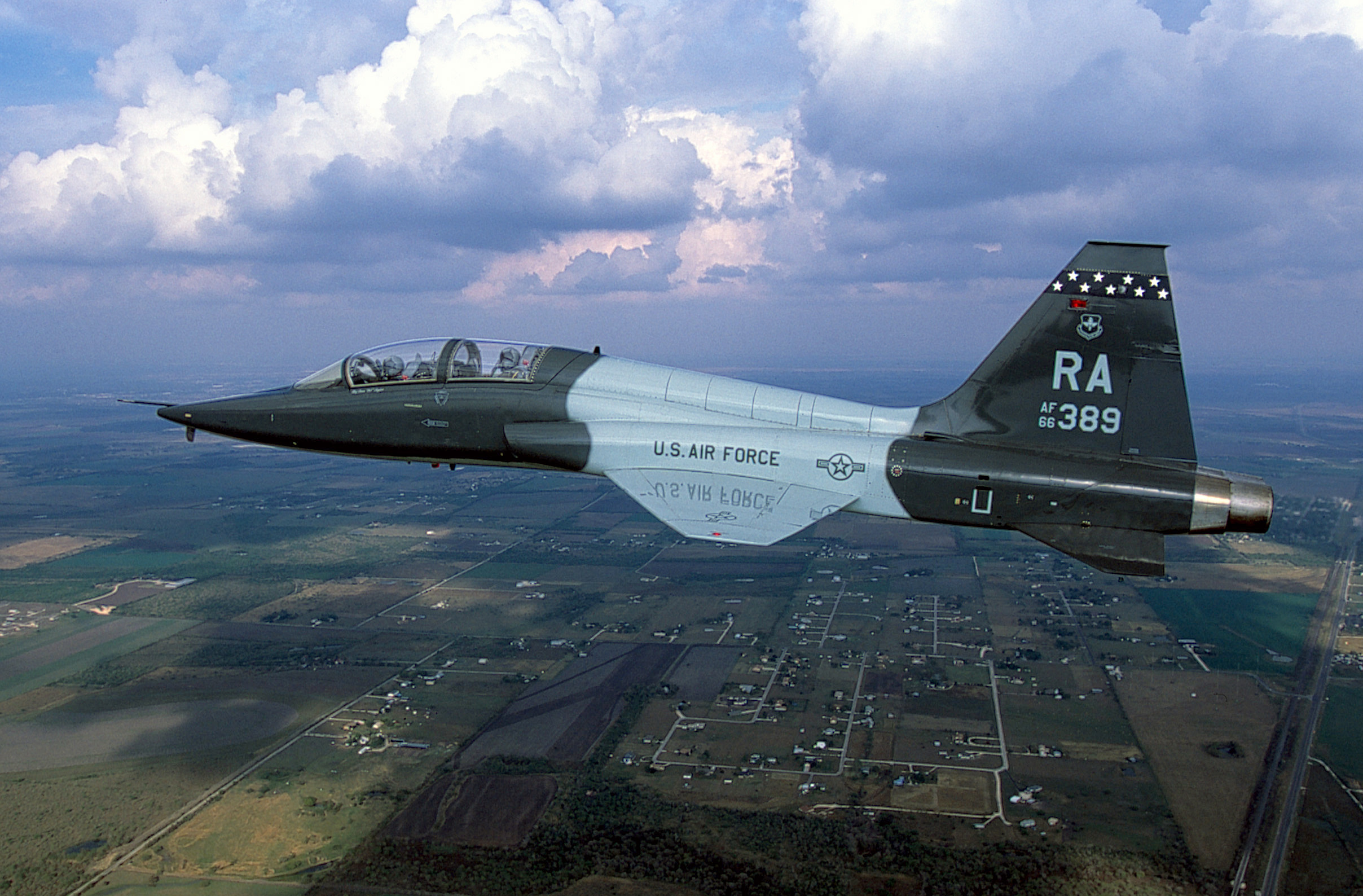
A USAF T-38A Talon from 560th Flying Training Squadron, Randolph Air Force Base Texas

Custodio earned a Bachelor of Arts degree from the University of Puerto Rico and worked for various industries before landing a job in the accounting department of Prinair (Puerto Rico International Airlines). There she met Edwin Custodio, with whom she would eventually have two children. She later worked for the US Department of Defense (DoD) in Panama. With the support of her husband, she presented herself before Headquarters, Air Force Military Personnel Center (AFMPC) to apply for the United States Air Force Officer Training School. Upon admission, Custodio was accepted as a pilot candidate to become a United States Air Force pilot.

She entered the Flight Screening Pilot Officer Training School in January 1980. After successful completion of Flight Screening she entered Officer Training School and was commissioned a Second Lieutenant. She qualified for Air Education and Training Command Undergraduate Pilot Training (UPT) at Laughlin Air Force Base in Texas and graduated the following year, thus becoming the first Latina to complete the U.S. Air Force military pilot training.

Her first military assignment was that of instructor pilot at Laughlin AFB. She was the first female to become a Northrop T-38 Talon (T-38) UPT flight instructor at that base. The T-38 Talon is the Air Force's two-seat, supersonic jet trainer. On one occasion a bird struck the engine of her plane in bad weather while she was in flight. She was able to overcome the emergency and safely land her plane. Because of this she was recognized by the Air Force, and awarded the HQ AETC Aviation Safety Award for superior airmanship.

Custodio was later assigned to Randolph Air Force Base where she was also the first female T-38 Instructor Pilot. During her career she also served as Pilot Instructor Training; T-41 Flight Screening - Operations Officer and Check Pilot.

Custodio retired from the Air Force with the rank of lieutenant colonel in October 2003, after serving in the military for 23 years and 10 months. Her last assignment as a United States Air Force Reserve officer was that of accountability and readiness the Directorate of Personnel, HQ USAF.

== Commercial airline captain ==
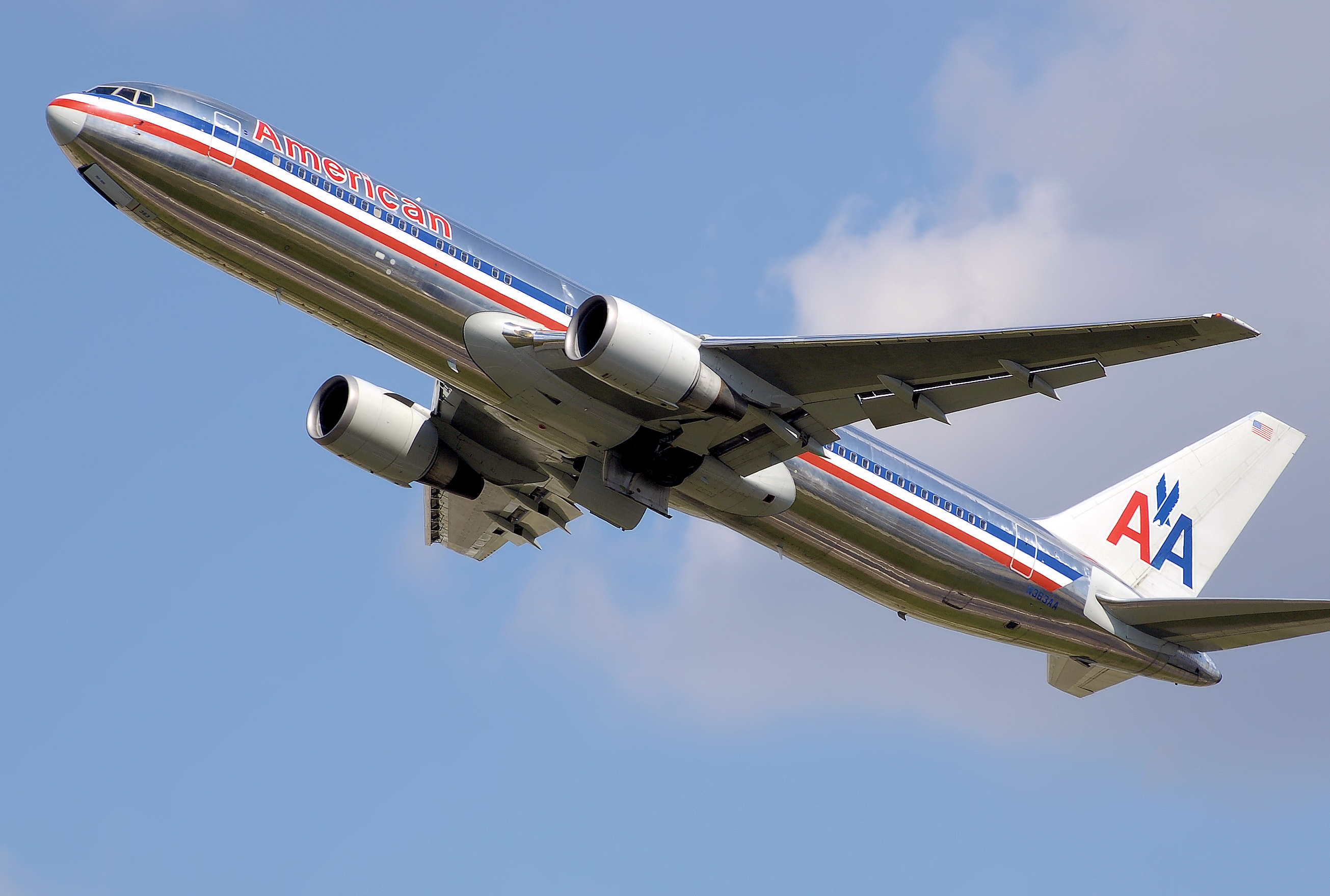
Boeing 767-300ER, one of the many types of American Airline aircraft flown by Custodio

In June 1988, while she was serving in the US Air Force Reserve, she was hired by American Airlines as a commercial pilot. Custodio became one of the first Latina commercial airline captains. During her years with American, she flew various types of aircraft. She piloted the Boeing 727, Fokker 100, Boeing 757 and Boeing 767 to various countries in Europe, the Caribbean, Central America and South America. She also flew to Mexico, Canada and to various cities in the United States. Custodio retired from American Airlines in February 2008, with over 11,000 flight hours.

== Later years ==
Custodio retired from the military after 24 years of service and lives in San Antonio, Texas, with her husband. There she founded "Dragonfly Productions LLC," a production company that creates personal film documentaries. In 1992, she founded the Ballet Folklorico Borikèn, the Puerto Rican folk ballet.

Custodio is a trustee of the Order of Daedalians Foundation, a board member and treasurer for the Women in Aviation Alamo City Chapter and board member for the Dee Howard Foundation. Custodio also serves as vice president of the Hispanic Association of Aviation and Aerospace Professionals (HAAAP). These organizations inspire young students in the San Antonio and surrounding areas to seek civilian and military aviation careers. They hosts students to tour various airplanes and control towers and also speak to students in all grades to present career opportunities in aviation and aerospace.

== Memberships ==
Among the many associations in which Custodio is a member are the following:

- Charter member of the Women Military Aviators Association
- The Women in Aviation, International, Inc.
- Order of Daedalians
- The Allied Pilots Association.

== Education and professional certificates ==
Besides the Bachelor of Arts degree which she earned in the University of Puerto Rico, Custodio has also earned the following:

- Air Transport Pilot certificate with single and multiengine land and instrument ratings.
- Flight Engineer Certificate – Turbojet Powered rating
- Radiotelephone Operator permit
- FAA Medical Certificate

== Recognitions ==
Custodio was recognized twice by the Senate of Puerto Rico. In 2001, she was recognized by Elizabeth Arden/Revista Imagen of Puerto Rico as one of the recipient of La Belleza Inteligente 2001 award. In 2017, Custodio was inducted into the San Antonio Aviation and Aerospace Hall of Fame for being the first Hispanic female military pilot in the United States Air Force. in she was recognized with the Presidential National 35th Hispanic Heritage Foundation STEM Award.

== See also ==
- List of Puerto Ricans
- Puerto Rican women in the military
- List of Puerto Rican military personnel
- Military history of Puerto Rico
- Hispanics in the United States Air Force
- History of women in Puerto Rico
