= Margot Arce de Vázquez =

Puerto Rican activist and writer

- Dr. Margot Arce de Vázquez
- Born: March 10, 1904; Caguas, Puerto Rico
- Died: November 14, 1990 (aged 86); Hato Rey, Puerto Rico
- Occupations: writer, essayist and educator
- Writing career
- Notable work: Founded the Puerto Rican Academy of the Spanish Language

Margot Arce de Vázquez (March 10, 1904 – November 14, 1990) was a writer, essayist and educator who founded the Puerto Rican Academy of the Spanish Language.

== Early years ==
Arce de Vázquez was born and raised in Caguas, Puerto Rico, where she received her primary and secondary education. In 1922, she graduated from that city's Central High School and following her graduation enrolled in the University of Puerto Rico in Río Piedras, San Juan.

As a university student she sympathized with the Puerto Rican Nationalist Party and became involved in the independence movement of the island. She was also the editor of the university's newspaper where she often expressed her views. After she majored and earned her bachelor's degree in mathematics and Spanish she went to Spain and enrolled in the Central University of Madrid. Among her educators were the essayist Américo Castro and the poet Dámaso Alonso. Their teachings influenced Arce de Vázquez for the rest of her life. In 1930, she earned her doctorate in philosophy and letters. Her thesis was about Garcilaso de la Vega, a work which she would publish later in her life.

== Educator ==
When Arce de Vázquez returned to Puerto Rico, she was hired by her alma mater. She founded the Department of Hispanic Studies and was its director from 1943 to 1965. Among the distinguished Puerto Ricans she influenced were Luis de Arrigoitia, Mariano Feliciano, José Ferrer Canales and Rosario Ferré. In 1953, she helped organize and presided over the committee in charge of transferring the body of Puerto Rican poet Julia de Burgos from New York City to the island. In 1955, Arce de Vázquez founded the Puerto Rican Academy of the Spanish Language. During her spare time she wrote essays expressing her pro-independence views, which were published in many of the island's magazines and newspapers.

== Author ==
Arce de Vázquez edited the works of Puerto Rican poet Luis Palés Matos. Two of her most important works were: Notas Puertorriqueñas (1950) (Puerto Rican Notes) and Gabriela Mistral, persona y poesía (1958) (Gabriela Mistral: The Poet and her Work). These works were highly acclaimed and received awards from the Puerto Rican Institute of Literature.

== Written works ==
- Literatura puertorriqueña
- Obras Completas De Margot Arce De Vázquez
- Gabriela Mistral: The Poet and Her Work
- Lecturas Puertorriqueñas: Prosa (Puerto Rico: Realidad y Anhelo, Número 2), by Mariana Robles de Cardona, Margot Arce de Vázquez (Editor)

== Final years ==
The Puerto Rican Academy of the Spanish Language bestowed upon Arce de Vázquez the title of "Profesora Emeritus" upon her retirement in 1970. Dr. Margot Arce de Vázquez died on November 14, 1990, in Hato Rey, Puerto Rico from Alzheimer's disease. She was buried at the Puerto Rico Memorial Cemetery in Carolina, Puerto Rico.

== In memory ==
In 1996, the Río Piedras Rotary Club dedicated the 50th anniversary issue of their magazine Asomante to the memory of Arce de Vázquez and to Nilita Vientos Gastón. Also in 1996, the Central University of Bayamón honored her memory by renaming their library after her.

== See also ==
- List of Puerto Ricans
- Puerto Rican Nationalist Party
