= Melina Almodóvar =

Puerto Rican salsa singer-songwriter, dancer, and entertainer

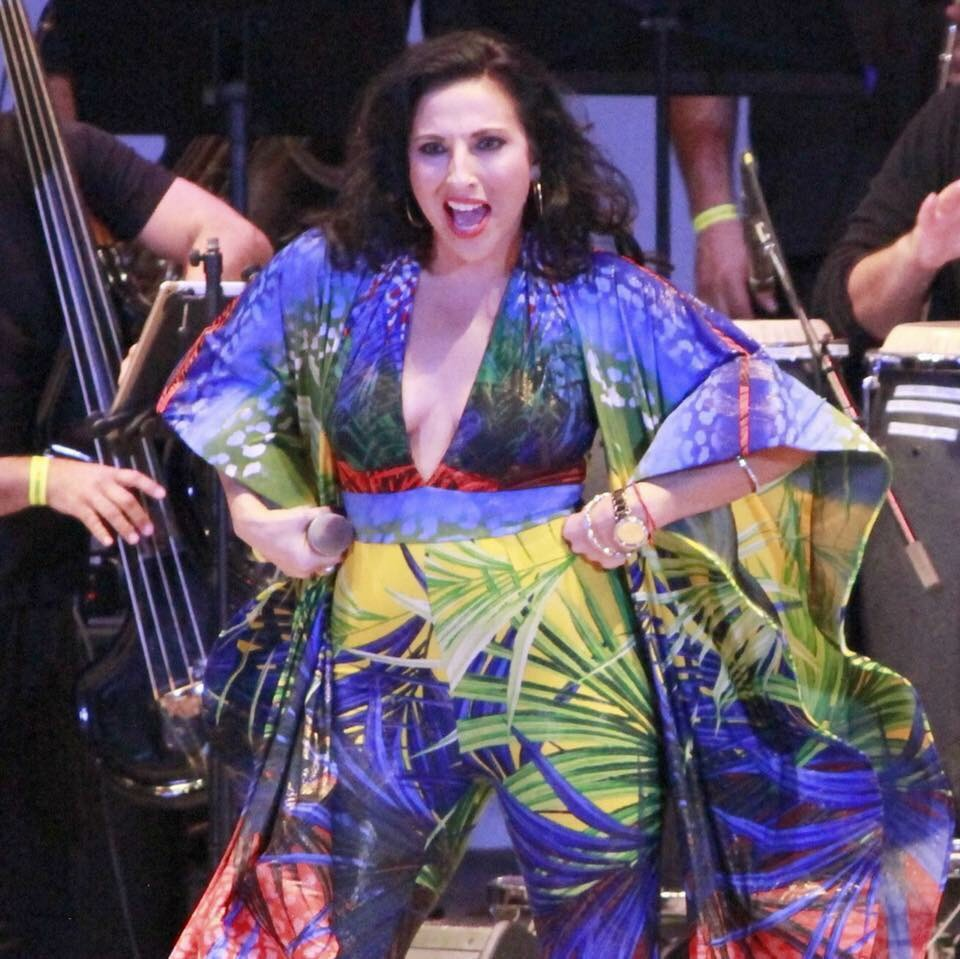
- Almodovar performing with salsa orchestra at Hollywood Salsa Festival, 2018.

Background information
- Also known as: La Muñeca de la Salsa; La Chica del Bling
- Born: Ilsa Melina Almodóvar Sánchez; June 3, 1979 (age 46); Santurce, Puerto Rico
- Genres: Latin, World, Salsa
- Occupations: Singer-songwriter, musician, dancer
- Instrument: Vocals
- Years active: 1995–present
- Website: www.melinasalsamusic.com

Melina Almodóvar (born Ilsa Melina Almodóvar Sánchez in Santurce, Puerto Rico), also known as La Muñeca de la Salsa and La Chica Del Bling, is a Puerto Rican salsa singer, songwriter, dancer, and entertainer. Known for her high-energy performances and salsa dancing skills, she combines old-school salsa moves with contemporary styles of dancing and singing. She established the Orquesta Caliente salsa orchestra in the Southern United States.

== Early life ==
Almodóvar was born on June 3, 1979, in Santurce, a barrio of San Juan, Puerto Rico. Her family split its time between Levittown and Cataño, Puerto Rico. Her parents, Ilsa Milagros Sánchez Rodríguez and José Luis Almodóvar Hernández, divorced when she was one year old. Her father married Evangeline Garland five years after the divorce, and they had two daughters, Gretchen Evangeline Almodóvar Garland and Carina Cristina Almodóvar Garland.

Almodóvar's father was a bolero singer and, along with his brothers, had a small group called Boleros y Algo Mas. They traveled around Puerto Rico playing music inspired by José José, Marco Antonio Muñiz, Raúl di Blasio, and Camilo Sesto; Almodóvar was named after one of Sesto's hit songs, "Melina". Her mother was a Flamenco dancer who later worked in medicine. Her maternal grandmother, Elia, was a sculptor, painter, and poet who fueled Almodóvar's artistic interests, taking her to plays and concerts from an early age.

After Almodóvar's father died in 1989, her mother married a man from Memphis, Tennessee, and moved the family there. Almodóvar has described her introduction to the United States as a "culture shock" and said that it was hard for her to make friends. She turned to music for solace, and the move became a frequent subject of her songs. Soon after, she received a cassette of songs by Rubén Blades and Celia Cruz as a Christmas gift from her grandmother and discovered that she had a natural ability for tropical music, salsa, and merengue. She also started listening to Memphis musicians such as Al Green, Otis Redding, and The Staple Singers, and she befriended record producer Willie Mitchell's grandchildren, who attended Houston High School with her in Germantown, Tennessee.

Almodóvar was accepted to Berklee College of Music but did not attend. She worked for a short time as a translator and assistant for the Memphis City Council as she briefly considered a career in politics. Later, she studied music performance at the University of Memphis.

== Career beginnings ==
At sixteen, Almodóvar started performing around Memphis with bands from various genres, including rock, blues, jazz, and gospel. She was soon approached by a group of music professors from the University of Memphis to start a salsa band. She agreed and was given a repertoire of salsa classics. The band, Orquesta Caliente, traveled across the South to play at events like the King Biscuit Blues Festival and the Beale Street Music Festival. It was the first Latin band to play on Beale Street, and was nominated for Best New Band and Best New Artist at the 1999 Grammy Awards.

Almodóvar began traveling to Nashville on the weekends to perform and write songs with other musicians. However, she soon decided to focus on salsa music and moved back to Puerto Rico. She traveled all over the island, listening to music, experimenting with sounds, and learning how to sing and dance salsa.

"La Chica de San Juan" became the title track of her 2003 album Rumba's SalsaSoul Delight. The album reflected a mixture of tropical and soul rhythms, and employed a Spanglish style of language that emerged with the influx of Latinos to the United States. Almodóvar returned to the United States to promote it. Upon her return, Ramses Arraya—the percussionist for the Costa Rican band Editus, which backed Rubén Blades on his two Grammy-nominated records asked her to perform on a record he was producing, "Corazón en Clave" (Heart in Clave). She traveled to Miami, Florida, to record the song "Yo Soy la Rumba" (I Am the Rumba), and soon relocated there permanently.

"I am Puerto Rican, and Puerto Rico lives in me, in everything I do," Almodóvar said. "Memphis is also a part of me, and it makes me the artist I am, but Miami is where it all comes together for me. The mixture of all the beautiful peoples of our Latin American countries, it fuels my soul."

== Move To Miami ==
In Miami, Almodóvar became a sought-after performer, opening for artists like Tommy Olivencia and La Sonora Ponceña. She also performed with Larry Harlow. Her first single in Miami, "Yo Soy La Rumba", was produced by her musical director Ramses Araya. This was the No. 2 single hit on tropical radio. Almodóvar established a residency in Miami every Tuesday night for nine years at Tapas & Tintos on Española Way in the city of Miami Beach. She also performed at the 100 years celebration of the city of Miami Beach and was awarded the Key to the City of Miami Beach in 2014 by Mayor Philip Levine.

By this time Almodóvar had produced her first full album in Miami "La Muñeca de la Salsa y Mas" that included an ode to her father's band in Puerto Rico "Boleros y Mas"

== Collaboration with Bobby Cruz ==
In 2016 Bobby Cruz, a pioneer of salsa music as Richie Ray and Bobby Cruz created a new group called "Salsa Factory Bunch" that showcased new and emerging salsa artists, including Almodóvar. She was selected to sing an original song originally written and arranged by Bobby Cruz for Richie Ray and Bobby Cruz and La Sonora Ponceña in November 2016 at the Choliseo of Puerto Rico. The song was played later all over the world in salsa stations.

== Collaboration with Tito Puente Jr. ==
Almodóvar and Tito, the son of the well known of Latin music exponent "Rey del Timbal" Tito Puente, had met in 2001 in Nashville, TN where she was performing with her Orchestra at a local club and he had sat in with her band. After Almodóvar moved to Miami, Tito was paired with her on several shows. When Tito was looking for a female singer to record "Mi Socio", a remake of the 1965 song featured in "Tito Puente Swings – The Exciting Lupe Sings" with an arrangement by his father, he asked Almodóvar to be the singer on it. Since then Tito and Almodóvar have become a much sought after duo, traveling all over the world performing his father's music as well as hers. "Mi socio" has become a favorite of salsa dancers everywhere. Tito and Almodóvar have performed at the new Yankee Stadium in New York City and also perform regularly at the Ball and Chain in Miami's Little Havana district, as well as at the Calle Ocho festival.

== Hollywood Salsa Festival in Florida ==
In 2014, Melina Almodóvar and her production partner Cristina Moinelo entered into a collaboration with the local Community Redevelopment Agency to hold a regular concert series in Hollywood, Florida dedicated to Salsa Music. The venue of Arts Park at Young Circle had a stage and auditorium with enough space for families and salsa lovers and was selected as the venue. At the fifth event, in 2018, 10,000 people attended. The festival has become a staple in Florida and salsa fans attend this free event annually.

It is composed of salsa dance performances, live orchestras and traditional Latin food and drink, all of hosted and also performed by Almodóvar and diverse guest performers. The festival is held annually on the first Saturday in April.

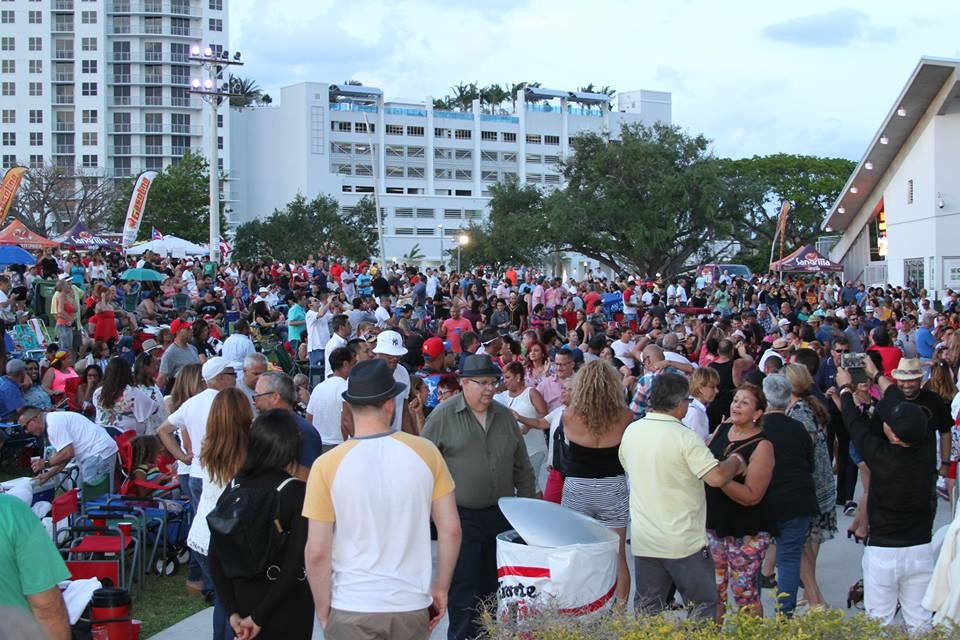
Crowd at Hollywood Salsa Festival # April 5, 7, 2018 Arts Park at Young Circle Hollywood, Florida

The week before is called Salsa Week by locals and includes salsa performances all over South Florida.

This festival yielded a spin-off festival in 2018 in Miami Beach city which was called "Miami Beach Salsa Festival", held on November 3 North Beach Band Shell. This was also produced by Almodóvar and her production company Almodovar Musica LLC.

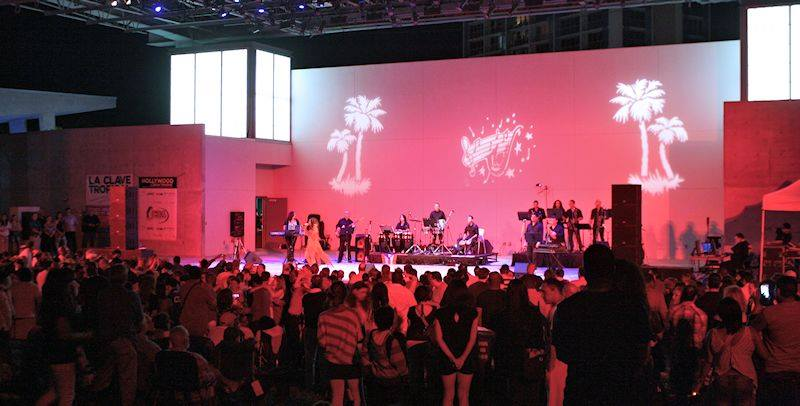
First Hollywood Salsa Festival in 2014

== Discography ==
- Rumba's SalsaSoul Delight (2003)
- Corazón en Clave (2005)
- Lista Pa Impresionar (2007)
- La Muñeca de la Salsa y Mas (2013)
- Pasión y Salsa Live (2015)
- Salsa Factory Bunch by Bobby Cruz (2016)
- Mi Socio – Tito Puente Jr. Featuring Melina Almodovar (2017)
