= Julia de Burgos =

Puerto Rican poet (1914–1953)

- de Burgos in the early 1950s
- Born: Julia Constancia Burgos García; February 17, 1914; Carolina, Puerto Rico
- Died: July 6, 1953 (aged 39); Manhattan, New York, United States
- Occupations: Poet, activist
- Writing career
- Period: 20th century
- Genres: Lyric poetry, lament
- Notable works: El Rio Grande de Loiza; Yo misma fui mi ruta; A Julia De Burgos
- Movement: Puerto Rican Independence

Julia Constanza Burgos García (February 17, 1914 – July 6, 1953), known as Julia de Burgos, was a Puerto Rican poet, journalist, Puerto Rican independence advocate, and teacher. As an advocate of Puerto Rican independence, she served as Secretary General of the Daughters of Freedom, the women's branch of the Puerto Rican Nationalist Party. She was also a civil rights activist for women and African and Afro-Caribbean writers.

== Early years ==
Julia de Burgos was born Julia Constanza Burgos García to Francisco Burgos Hance, a farmer, and Paula García de Burgos. Her father was a member of the Puerto Rico National Guard and had a farm near the town of Carolina, Puerto Rico, where she was born. The family later moved to the barrio of Santa Cruz of the same city. She was the oldest of thirteen children. Six of her younger siblings died of malnutrition.

After Burgos graduated from Muñoz Rivera Primary School in 1928, her family moved to Rio Piedras, where she was awarded a scholarship to attend University High School. In 1931, she enrolled in University of Puerto Rico, Rio Piedras Campus to become a teacher.

In 1933, at the age of 19, Burgos graduated from the University of Puerto Rico with a degree in teaching. She became a teacher and taught at Feijoo Elementary School in Barrio Cedro Arriba of Naranjito, Puerto Rico. She worked as a writer for a children's program under Puerto Rico's Department of Public Instruction on public radio, but was reportedly fired for her political beliefs. Among her early influences were Luis Lloréns Torres, Mercedes Negrón Muñoz, Rafael Alberti and Pablo Neruda. According to Burgos, "My childhood was all a poem in the river, and a river in the poem of my first dreams." Her first work was Río Grande de Loíza.

== Nationalism ==
In 1934, Burgos married Ruben Rodriguez Beauchamp and ended her teaching career. In 1936, she became a member of the Puerto Rican Nationalist Party (Partido Nacionalista de Puerto Rico), led by Pedro Albizu Campos. She was elected to the position of Secretary General of the Daughters of Freedom, the women's branch of the party. She divorced her husband in 1937.

== Literature ==
External audio
- "Río Grande de Loíza" recited on YouTube

By the early 1930s, Burgos had published her work in journals and newspapers. At the intersection of her identity as an Afro-Latina woman in a conservative culture, her work discusses feminism, rebellion, love, social justice, identity, resistance, colonialism, and much more. She published two collections of poetry, Poema en 20 surcos (1938) and Canción de la verdad sencilla (1939) in her lifetime. Her third collection, El mar y tú: otros poemas (1954) was edited and published after her death by her sister, Consuelo Burgos. For her first two books, she traveled around the island promoting her work by giving book readings. Her third book was published posthumously in 1954. Burgos' lyrical poems are a combination of the intimate, the land and the social struggle of the oppressed. Many critics assert that her poetry anticipated the work of feminist writers and poets as well as that of other Hispanic authors. In one of her poems, she writes: "I am life, strength, woman." Burgos received awards and recognition for her work and was celebrated by poets including Pablo Neruda, whom she met in Cuba, and stated that her calling was to be one of the greatest poet of the Americas.

Among Burgos' works are:

- Poema en veinte surcos (1938)
- Canción de la verdad sencilla (1939)
- El mar y tú: otros poemas (1954)
- Río Grande de Loíza
- Poema para Mi Muerte (My Death Poem),
- Yo Misma Fui Mi Ruta (I Was My Own Path),
- Alba de Mi Silencio (Dawn of My Silence),
- Alta Mar y Gaviota

== Later years ==
Later in life, Burgos became romantically involved with Dr. Juan Isidro Jimenes Grullón, a Dominican physician. According to Grullón, many of her poems during that time were inspired by the love that she felt for him. In 1940, Burgos and Jimenes Grullón traveled first to Cuba, where she briefly attended the University of Havana, and then later to New York City, where she worked as a journalist for Pueblos Hispanos, a progressive newspaper.

Shortly after their arrival in Cuba, Burgos' relationship with Jimenes Grullón became strained. After trying to save her relationship, she instead left and returned once again to New York in 1942, however this time alone, where she took menial jobs to support herself. In 1944, she married Armando Marín, a musician from Vieques. In 1947, the marriage also ended in divorce, lapsing Burgos into further depression and alcoholism.

"Farewell in Welfare Island"
By: Julia de Burgos

It has to be from here,
right this instance,
my cry into the world.
My cry that is no more mine,
but hers and his forever,
the comrades of my silence,
the phantoms of my grave.

In February 1953, Burgos wrote one of her last poems, "Farewell in Welfare Island." It was written during her last hospitalization and is believed by her peers to be one of the only poems she wrote in English. In the poem she foreshadows her death and reveals an ever darker concept of life.

== Death ==
On June 28, 1953, Burgos left the home of a relative in Brooklyn, where she had been residing. She disappeared without leaving a clue as to where she went.

It was later discovered that in the early morning hours of July 5, 1953, she had collapsed on a sidewalk in the Spanish Harlem section of Manhattan, and she died of pneumonia at a hospital in Harlem shortly after midnight on July 6, 1953, at the age of 39. Since no one claimed her body and she had no identification on her, the city gave her a pauper's burial on Hart Island, the city's only potter's field.

Eventually, some of her friends and relatives were able to trace her, find her grave, and claim her body. A committee was organized in Puerto Rico, presided over by Dr. Margot Arce de Vázquez, to have her remains transferred to the island. Burgos's remains arrived on September 6, 1953, and funeral services for her were held at the Puerto Rican Atheneum. She was given a hero's burial at the Municipal Cemetery of Carolina. A monument was later built at her burial site by the City of Carolina.

== Honors ==
In 1986, the Spanish Department of the University of Puerto Rico posthumously honored Burgos by granting her a doctorate in Human Arts and Letters.

Cities that have honored Burgos include:

- Carolina, Puerto Rico
  - Escuela Julia de Burgos
- Cleveland, Ohio
  - Julia De Burgos Cultural Arts Center
- New York City, New York
  - Julia de Burgos Cultural Center
  - Julia de Burgos Boulevard (corner of East 106th Street and Lexington Avenue)
  - Julia de Burgos Middle School (M.S. 99)
- Philadelphia, Pennsylvania
  - Julia de Burgos Elementary School
  - Julia de Burgos Magnet Middle School
- Chicago, Illinois
  - Julia de Burgos Park
- San Juan, Puerto Rico
  - Casa Protegida Julia de Burgos (domestic violence shelter)
- Willimantic, Connecticut
  - Julia de Burgos Pocket Park established by Curbstone Press

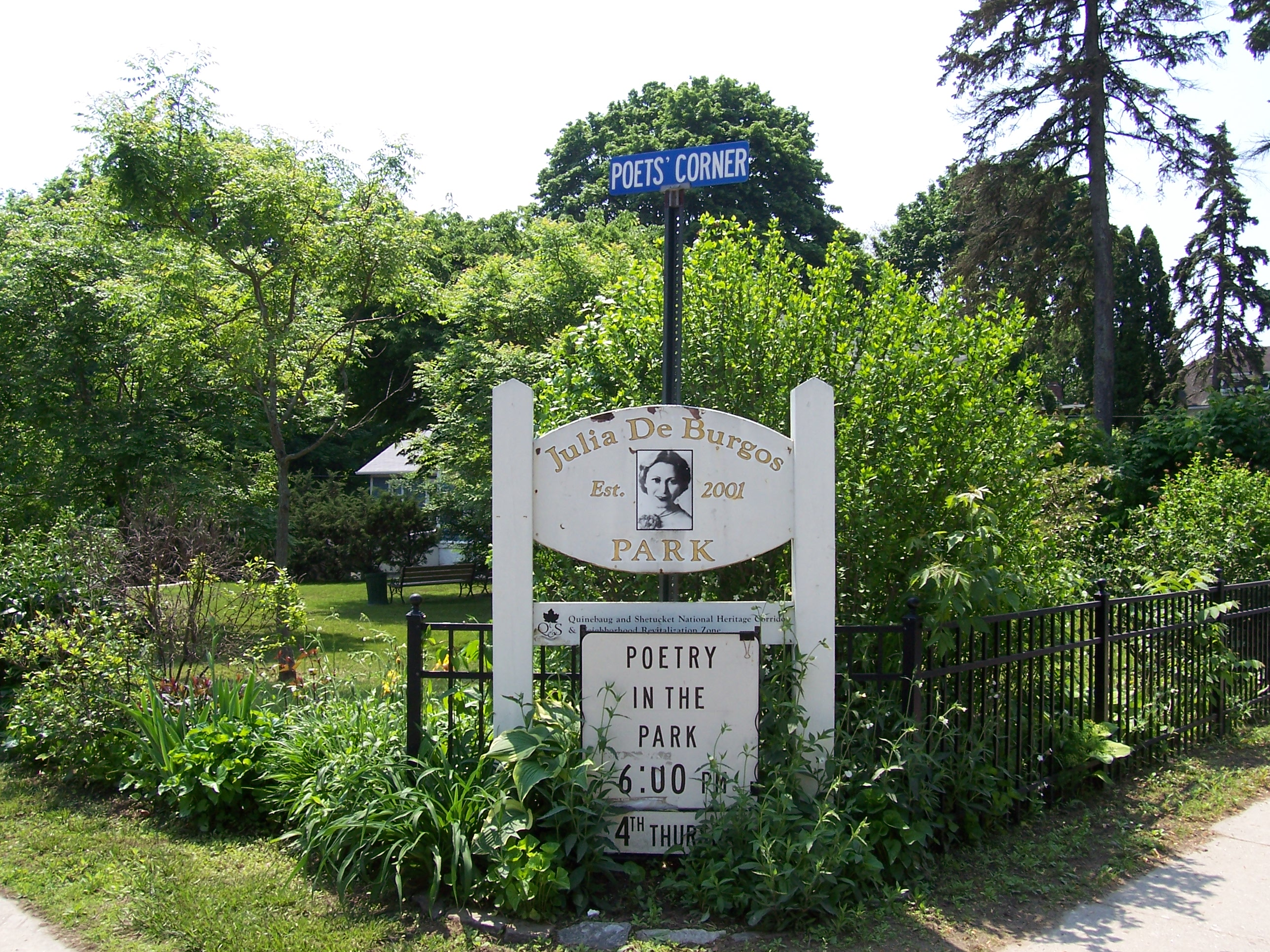
Julia de Burgos Park on the corner of Jackson Street and Terry Avenue in Willimantic

The Puerto Rican sculptor Tomás Batista sculpted a bust of de Burgos in the Julia de Burgos Park in Carolina. Isabel Cuchí Coll published a book about de Burgos titled Dos Poetisas de América: Clara Lair y Julia de Burgos. Puerto Rican poet Giannina Braschi, who was born the year of de Burgos' death, pays homage to her poetry and legend in the Spanglish novel Yo-Yo Boing!

At Yale University, the Latino Cultural Center is named in her honor, La Casa Cultural Julia de Burgos.

A documentary about the life of Burgos was made in 2002 titled "Julia, Toda en mi ... " (Julia, All in me ... ) directed and produced by Ivonne Belén. Another biopic about her life, "Vida y poesía de Julia de Burgos," was filmed and released in Puerto Rico in 1978.

In New York City, the Julia de Burgos Cultural Center, on 106th Street and Lexington Avenue, is named after her.

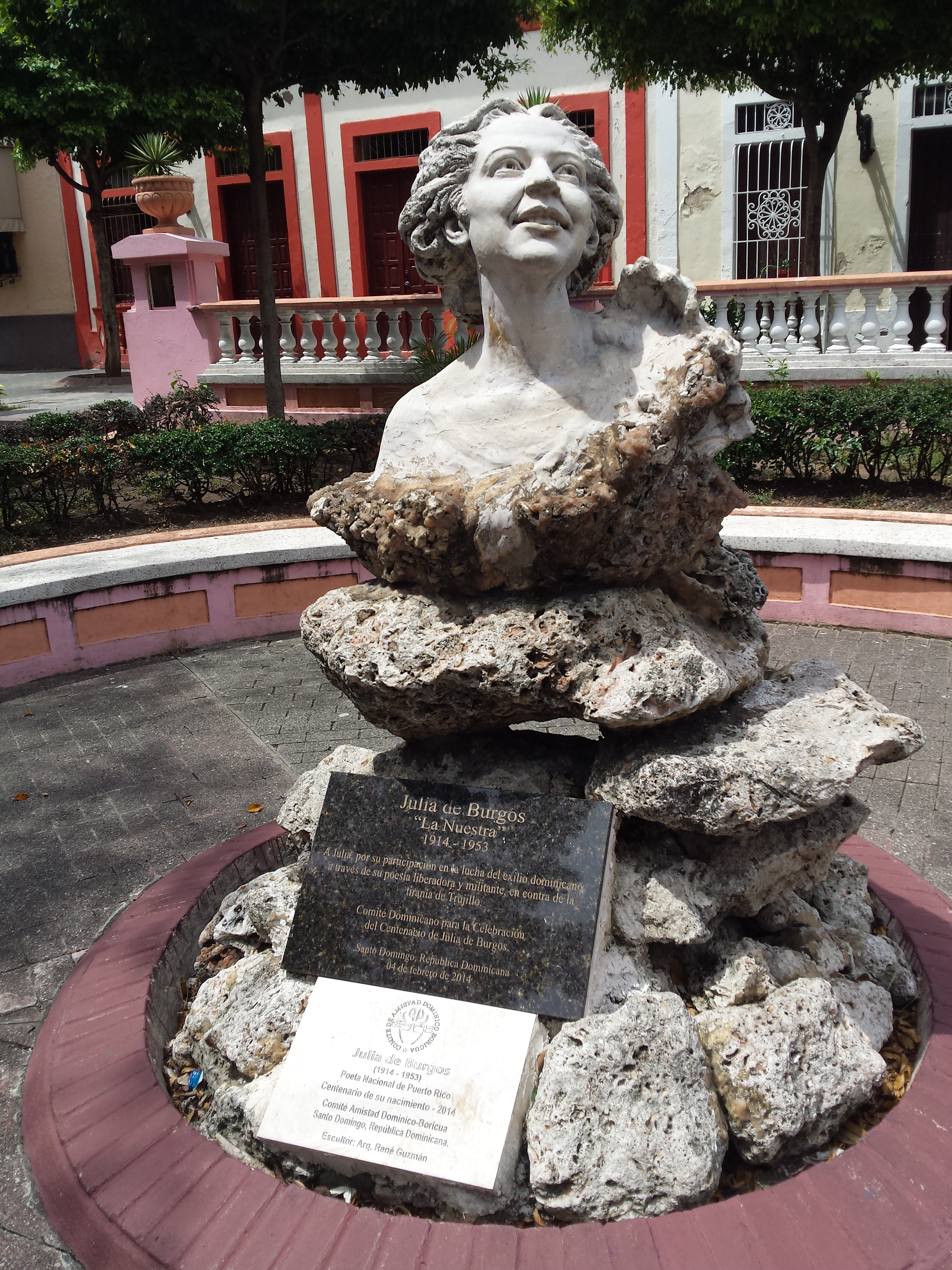
Bust of Julia de Burgos in Santo Domingo, Puerto Rico

On September 14, 2010, in a ceremony held in San Juan, the United States Postal Service honored Burgos' life and literary work with the issuance of a first class postage stamp, the 26th release in the postal system's Literary Arts series. The stamp's portrait was created by Toronto-based artist Jody Hewgill.

In 2011, Burgos was inducted into the New York Writers Hall of Fame.

There is a plaque, located at the monument to the Jayuya Uprising participants in Mayagüez, Puerto Rico, honoring the women of the Puerto Rican Nationalist Party. Burgos' name is on the sixth line of the third plate.

On May 29, 2014, The Legislative Assembly of Puerto Rico honored 12 illustrious women with plaques in the "La Plaza en Honor a la Mujer Puertorriqueña" (Plaza in Honor of Puerto Rican Women) in San Juan. According to the plaques each of the 12 women, who by virtue of their merits and legacies, stand out in the history of Puerto Rico. Burgos was among the 12 who were honored.

In September 2017, artist-activist Molly Crabapple (herself of Puerto Rican descent) disbursed the profits of the sales of her portrait of de Burgos to the Puerto Rico Hurricane Maria Recovery Fund. The giclée 17″ x 22″ print is captioned with one of the poet's most famous lines: "En todo me lo juego a ser lo que soy yo/I gamble everything to be what I am."

In 2018, the New York Times published a belated obituary for her as part of their Overlooked No More series.

== In music ==
The third movement of Leonard Bernstein's Songfest: A Cycle of American Poems for Six Singers and Orchestra is a setting of Burgos' poem "A Julia de Burgos". Jack Gottlieb wrote, "In angry words (sung in Spanish) she expresses her defiance of the dual role she plays as a conventional woman and as a liberated woman-poet. (Her poem antedates by two decades the women's liberation movement.) The music is sharply rhythmic, and might well be underscoring for a bullfight."

Composer Awilda Villarini set de Burgos' work to music in her composition "Two Love Songs."

== Publications ==
- I Am My Own Path: Selected Writings of Julia de Burgos (dual-language edition: Spanish, English, poetry, essays, letters), ed. Vanessa Pérez-Rosario. University of Texas Press, 2025. ISBN 978-1-4773-2791-3
- Song of the Simple Truth: The Complete Poems of Julia de Burgos (dual-language edition: Spanish, English), trans. Jack Agueros. Curbstone Books, 1997; ISBN 978-1-88068-424-5
- Yo misma fui mi ruta, Ediciones Huracán, 1986; ISBN 0-940238-30-6
- Amor y soledad, Ediciones Torremozas, 1994; ISBN 84-7839-136-3
- El Mar Y Tu, Ediciones Huracan, 1981; ISBN 0-940238-46-2
- Cancion De La Verdad Sencilla (Vortice Ser), Ediciones Huracan, 1982; ISBN 0-940238-66-7
- Poema en Veinte Surcos, Ediciones Huracan, 1983; ISBN 0-940238-23-3
- Poema Río Grande de Loíza
- Poemas exactos de mí misma
- Dame tu hora perdída
- Ay, ay, ay de la grifa negra

== Biographical/Documentary films ==
- "Julia...Todo En Mi" on the Internet Movie Database
- "Vida y poesía de Julia de Burgos on the Internet Movie Database

== See also ==
- List of Afro-Latinos
- List of Latin American writers
- List of Puerto Rican writers
- List of Puerto Ricans
- Puerto Rican literature
- Multi-Ethnic Literature of the United States
- Puerto Rican Nationalist Party
- History of women in Puerto Rico
- Blanca Canales
- Rosa Collazo
- Lolita Lebrón
- Ruth Mary Reynolds
- Isabel Rosado
- Isabel Freire de Matos
- Isolina Rondón
- Olga Viscal Garriga
