= Puerto Rico Police =

Law enforcement agency

Puerto Rico Police Bureau Oficina de la Policía de Puerto Rico
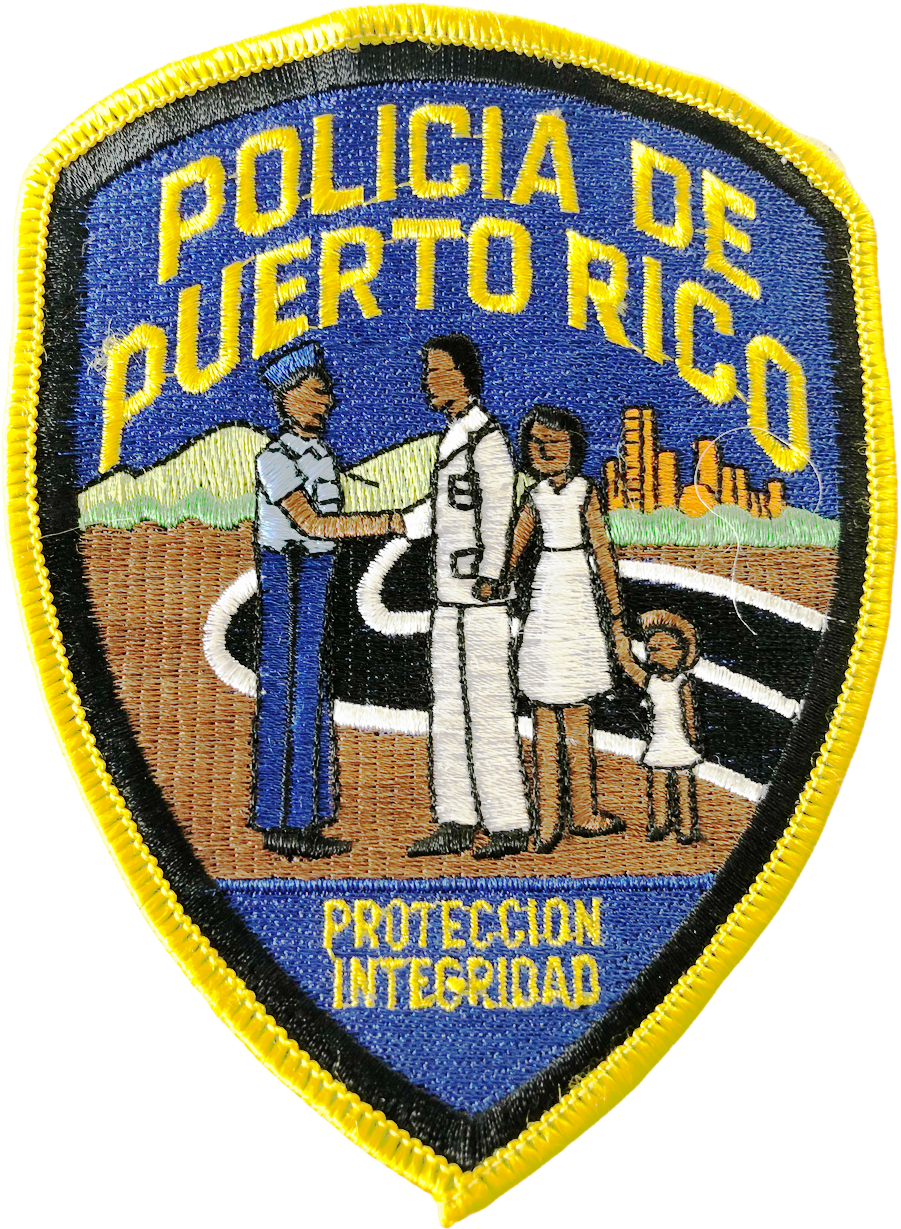
- Patch of the Puerto Rico Police

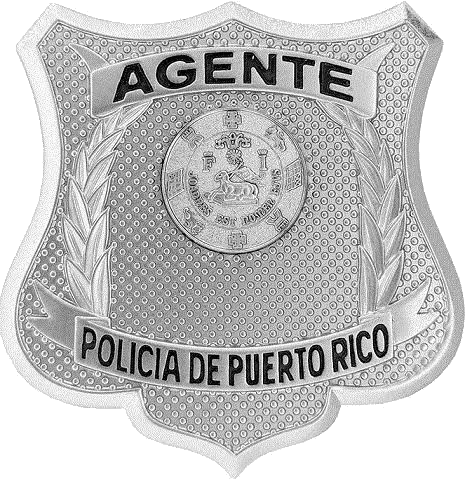
- Badge of a Puerto Rico Police officer
- Common name: La Uniformada (The Uniformed)
- Abbreviation: PRP
- Motto: Integrity and Protection

Agency overview
- Formed: February 21, 1899; 127 years ago
- Preceding agency: Puerto Rico Insular Police
- Dissolved: 1899–1956

Jurisdictional structure
- Operations jurisdiction: Puerto Rico
- Area: 5,324 square miles (13,790 km^{2})
- Population: 3,195,153 (2018 estimate)
- Legal jurisdiction: Commonwealth of Puerto Rico
- General nature: Civilian police

Operational structure
- Headquarters: Cuartel General, 601 Ave. Roosevelt, Hato Rey San Juan, PR 00936-8166
- Police Officers: 10,200 (2023 estimate)
- Agency executive: Joseph González, Superintendente
- Child agency: Puerto Rico Joint Forces of Rapid Action (PRJFRA)
- Supervisions: List: Field Operations; Management Services; Professional Responsibilities; Community Relations; Strategy Operations; Administrative Services; United Forces of Fast Action (F.U.R.A.); Criminal Investigations Corps; Highway Patrol; Drugs and Illegal Weapons
- Regions: List: San Juan; Bayamón; Ponce; Carolina; Fajardo; Arecibo; Aguadilla; Caguas; Humacao; Mayagüez; Aibonito; Guayama; Utuado

Facilities
- Districts and Precincts: 71 Districts (One station in town); 34 Precincts (more than 1 station in town); 13 Highway Patrol Areas
- Police cars & Motorcycles: Ford Crown Victoria Police Interceptor; Ford Explorer; Ford Taurus; Ford Econoline; Ford F-250; Chevrolet Trailblazer; Chevrolet Tahoe; Chevrolet Impala; Dodge Charger; Harley Davidson Electra Glide; Honda Shadow; Suzuki Intruder
- Aircraft: Bell 407; Bell 412; McDonnell Douglas MD-520N; Cessna 404 Titan; Cessna 310R

Website
- policia.pr.gov

The Puerto Rico Police (PPR; Spanish: Policía de Puerto Rico, lit. 'Police of Puerto Rico'), officially the Puerto Rico Police Bureau (Spanish: Oficina de la Policía de Puerto Rico, lit. 'Office of the Police of Puerto Rico'), is a law enforcement agency with jurisdiction over the entire Commonwealth of Puerto Rico. It is a division of the Puerto Rico Department of Public Safety (PR DPS), alongside the Puerto Rico Special Investigations Bureau and the Puerto Rico Municipal Police and handles both traffic and criminal law enforcement in the commonwealth. As of 2020, the Puerto Rico Police force had 11,532 members. It is organized into thirteen regions within the island for operational purposes. Its headquarters are located at 601 Franklin D. Roosevelt Avenue in San Juan.

== History ==
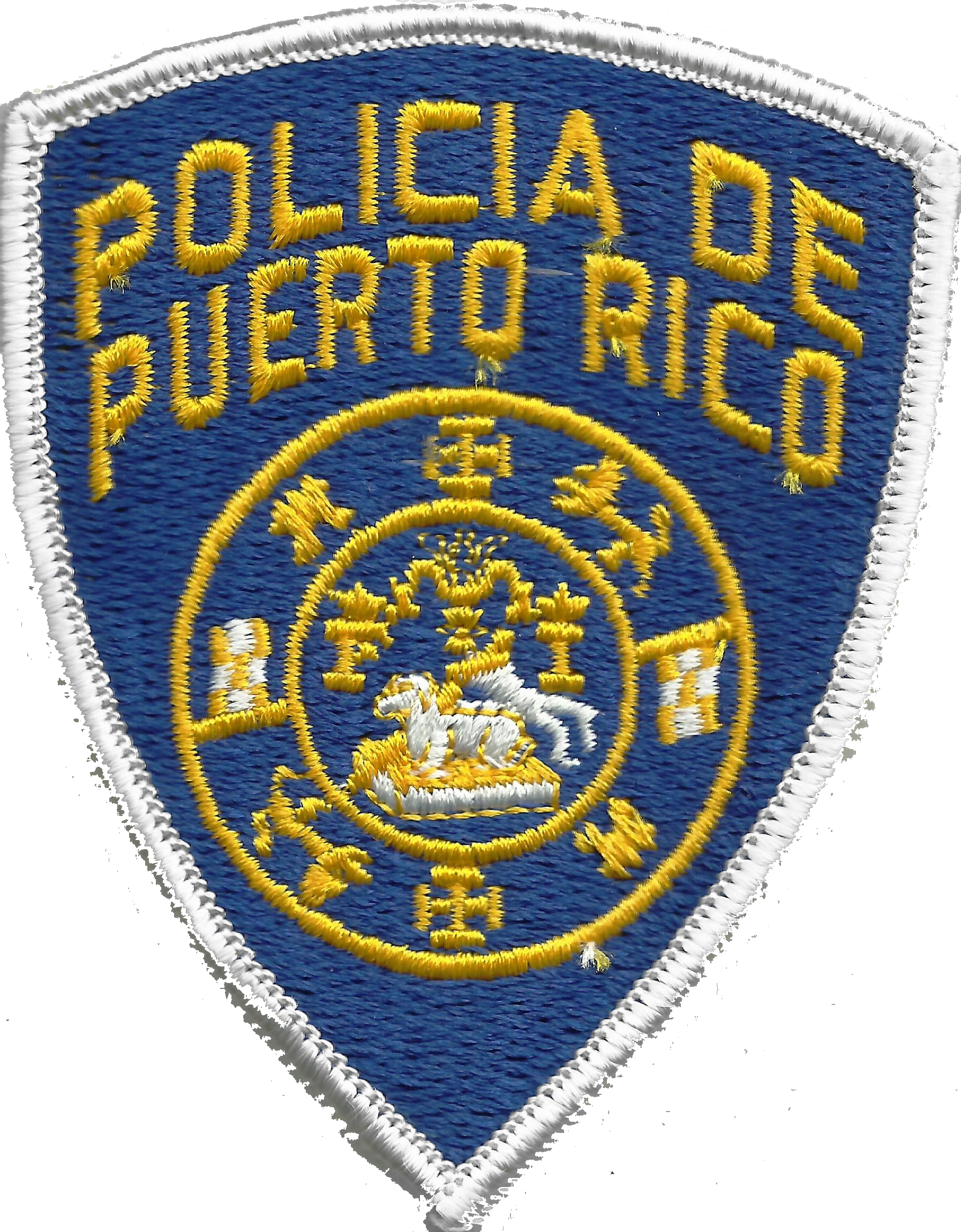
Former Puerto Rican police patch, used in the 1960s.

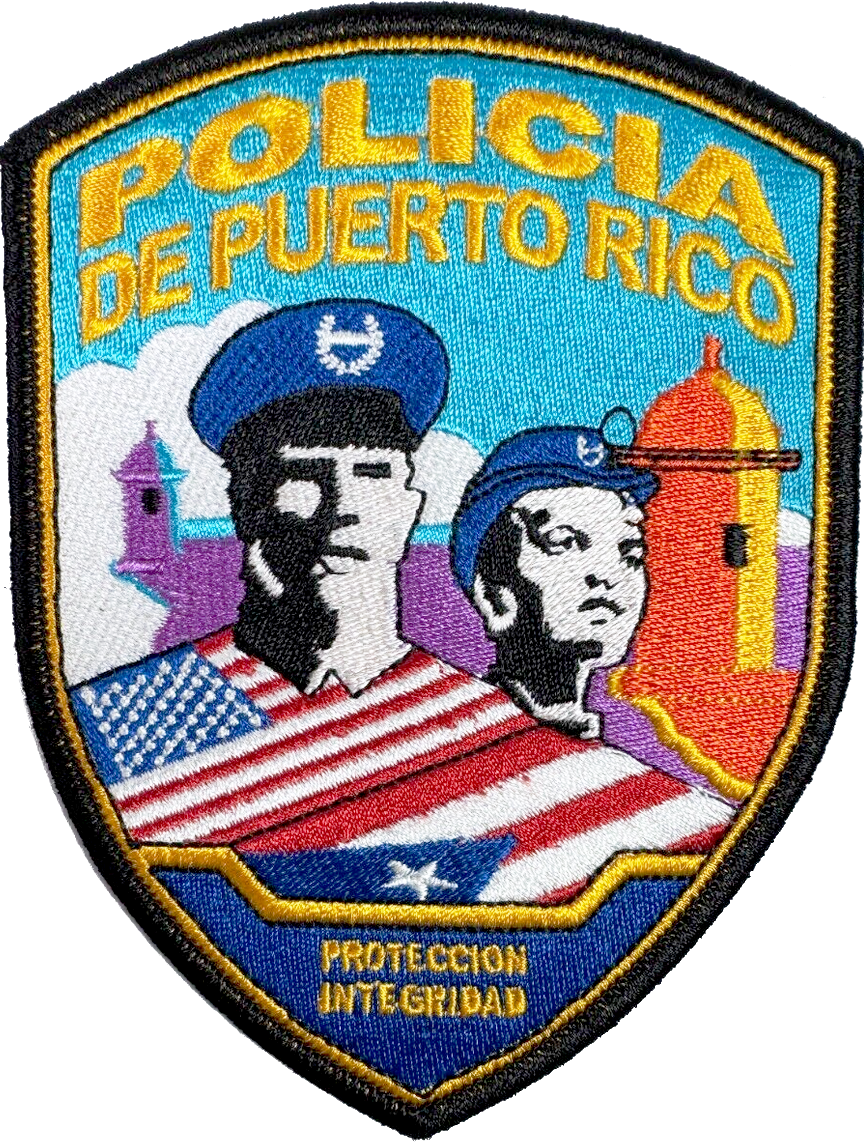
Former Puerto Rican police patch, used from 2004 to 2006.

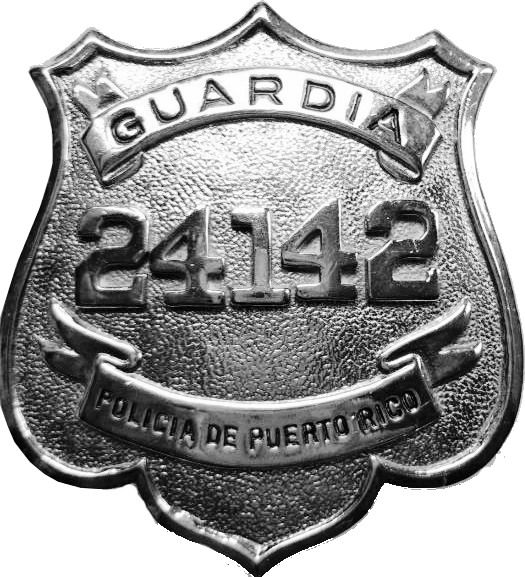
Old Puerto Rican police badge

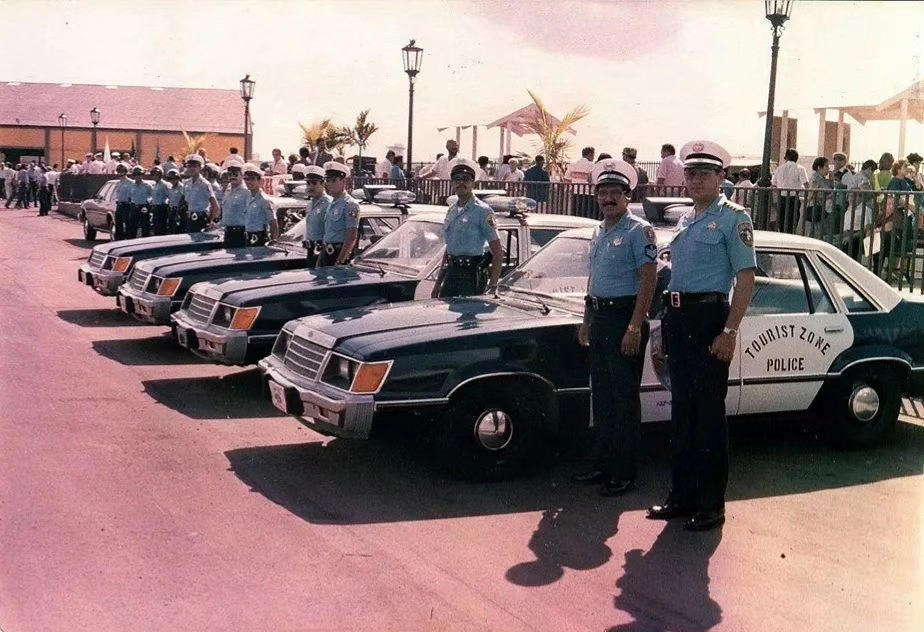
Puerto Rico Police Ford LTDs in the 1980s.

=== Origins ===
The first form of the Puerto Rico Police began in 1837, when Spanish governor Francisco Javier de Moreda y Prieto created La Guardia Civil de Puerto Rico (Puerto Rico Civil Guard) to protect the lives and property of Puerto Ricans, who at the time were Spanish subjects. It provided police services to the entire island, although many municipalities maintained their own police force.

Since taking possession of Puerto Rico in July 1898, as a result of the Spanish–American War, the United States has controlled the island as a US territory. The Insular Police of Puerto Rico was created on February 21, 1899, under the command of Colonel Frank Techner (US Marine Corps officer during the Spanish–American War), with an authorized strength of 313 sworn officers.

=== Ponce massacre ===
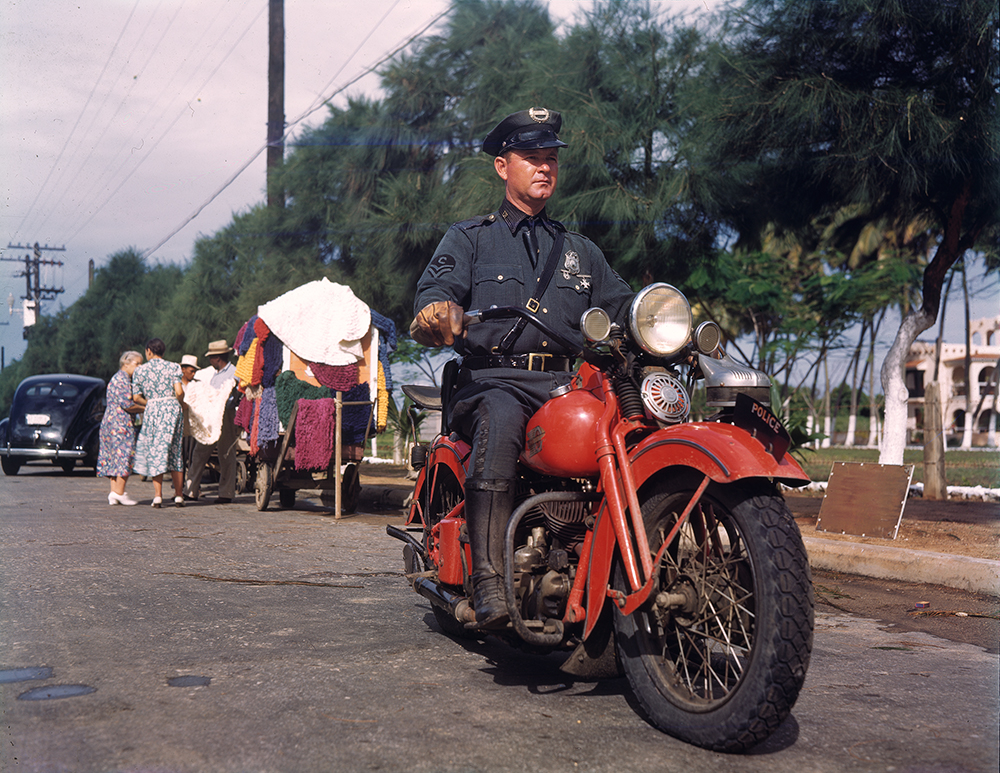
Police on motorcycle in 1939

On March 21, 1937, approximately 30 officers placed themselves in an intersection in downtown Ponce to block a march by the Puerto Rican Nationalist Party to celebrate the abolition of slavery and protest the incarceration of Pedro Albizu Campos. As the demonstrators marched, singing La Borinqueña (Puerto Rico's national anthem), General Blanton Winship, the U.S. appointed governor of Puerto Rico, ordered Chief of Police Guillermo Soldevilla to open fire on the protesters. The massacre lasted 15 minutes and resulted in 19 fatalities. This and other incidents involving the Insular Police fueled the Puerto Rico independence movement, leading to the burning of police stations and post offices in 1950, and the Jayuya Uprising.

=== Quasi-military ===
In 1980, in accordance with Law 26 of 1974, it was described as "a quasi-military" organization of public safety, later to be changed by the "Puerto Rico Police Act" (Act No. 53) of 10 June 1996 as a "Civil Organization" of public safety as those on the US mainland.

In 1993, governor Pedro Rosselló created a new plan to fight back against crime called Mano Dura Contra el Crimen (or "Strong Hand Against Crime") in which Puerto Rico Police officers were assisted by the Puerto Rico National Guard in everything that involved police work, except police investigations. They were better known because of the raids that they made in public housing complexes or "Caseríos" with rapid force and precision and also, the use of military vehicles and tactics. This program was put to the test from 1993 to 1996 and in total 48 police officers died in the line of duty. It was later activated again in 2004 by the governor Sila María Calderón but not with the same intensity as in the early 1990s.

=== Reorganization ===
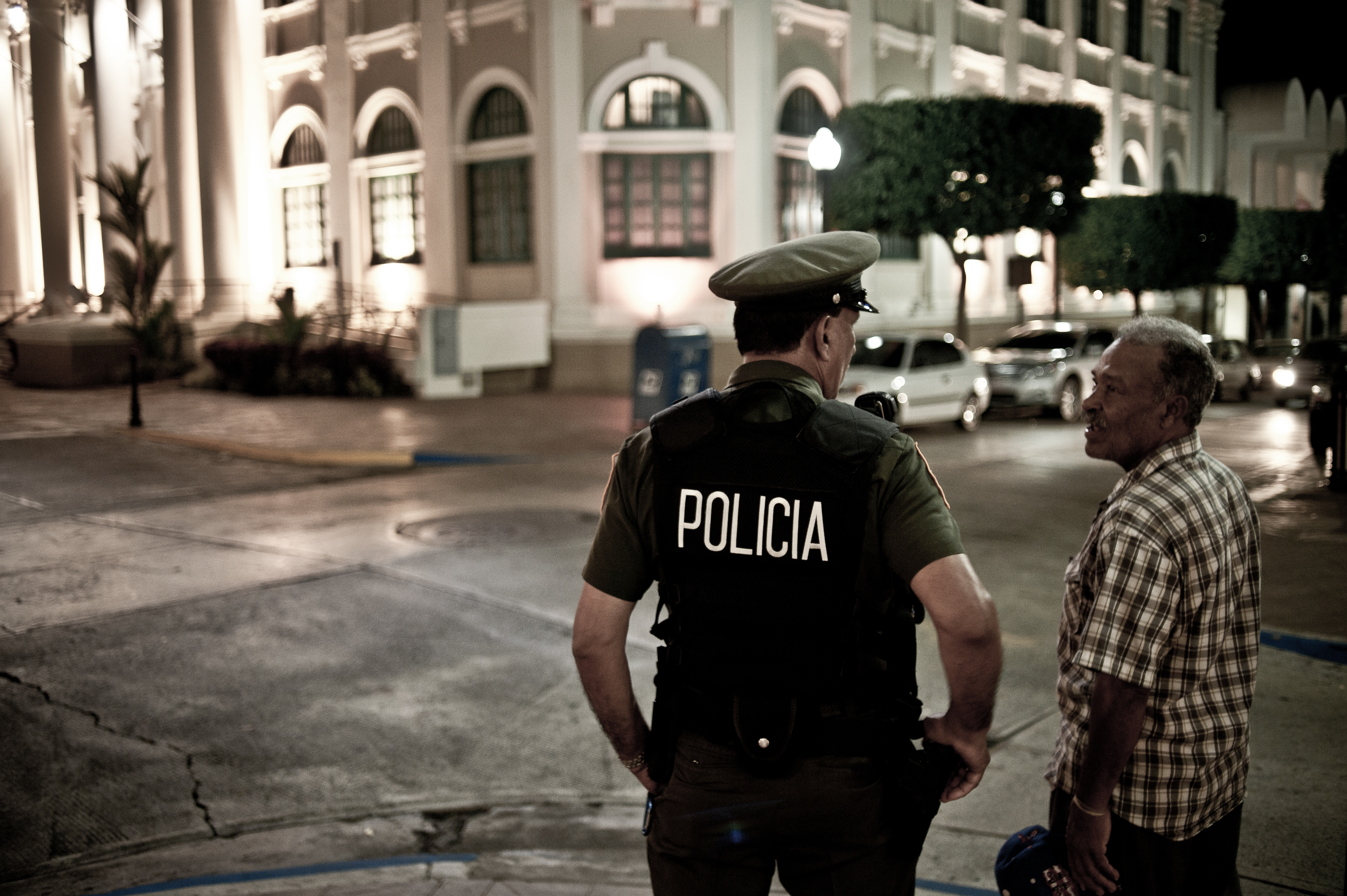
Police officer talking to a man in Mayagüez

In 2009, Police Superintendent José Figueroa Sancha reorganized the Puerto Rico Police in terms of commanding officers and regional organization. Every police zone was changed to have two commanding officers: one in charge of the field operations, and the other in charge of investigations. The name was changed from Police Zones to Police Regions. Also, a new policy of the agency was to get involved in the community. Officers must get out of their patrol cars and sometimes patrol on foot in neighborhoods, so they can talk to citizens and socialize, as well as identify the problems that exist in the neighborhood.

In 2017, Ricardo Rosselló, Governor of Puerto Rico, created the Public Security Department with Héctor Pesquera as its head which combined various government agencies under the control of a larger umbrella agency.

=== Financial problems ===
The economic crisis on the island and the budget of the island is currently under control of the Financial Oversight and Management Board for Puerto Rico created financial difficulties for the force. In 2019, the PRPD has dropped to 6,450 officers. The police force lost significant amounts of members as a result of officers retiring and reduced funding for recruitment. Estimates from 2018 suggested the force needed over a thousand more officers to meet the needs of the island. Representatives and senators proposed increase in the wages of the force to help increase recruitment. The lack of members affected the strength of the force and response to preventing crimes across the island.

== Rank structure ==
See footnote for statistics.
Rank	Comisario; Commissioner	Coronel; Colonel	Teniente coronel Lieutenant colonel	Comandante; Commander	Inspector; Inspector	Capitán; Captain	Teniente primero First lieutenant	Teniente segundo Second lieutenant	Sargento; Sergeant	Agente; Officer/ Agent	Cadete; Cadet
Insignia											No insignia
Description	Governor Appointee	Bureau/ Regional/ Administrative Commander	Regional/ Administrative Commander	Regional Commander	Division/ Unit/ District Commander	District/ Precinct/ Unit Commander/Supervisor	District/ Precinct/ Unit Commander	District/ Precinct Commander	Shift Supervisor	Patrol	

The Commissioner is the top commanding officer. He is one of five "head of government agencies" appointed by the Governor of Puerto Rico under the Department of Public Safety. He leads the department and makes orders to the agency, and also instructs the commanding officers for field operations.

Since 1899, police chiefs in Puerto Rico were appointed by the United States Government. Selecting the police chief was originally the responsibility of the commanding officer of the United States Army in Puerto Rico, who also served as the governor until 1900 when the Foraker Act was established. Afterward, police chiefs were named by the U.S. Appointed Governor of Puerto Rico and the Chief of Police could serve in that position for not more than 4 years.

Law #77 converted the Puerto Rico Insular Police into the Puerto Rico Police Department on June 22, 1956. This converted the department from a quasi-military organization into a civil police force. The Chief of Police position was replaced by a Superintendent. Since then, the police superintendent has been named by the Governor of Puerto Rico.

The Associate Superintendent is the second in command. He follows every order from the commissioner, including if the commissioner cannot do some specific things that the second in command can do. Also, in case of sickness, disability or death, the Associate Superintendent assumes the position of Commissioner.

The Auxiliary Superintendent of Field Operations is in charge of every activity in the Puerto Rico Police Department that is related to the protection of life and property, maintaining law and order, the protection of civil rights, and crime prevention, almost as a 2nd in command. He plans, coordinates, leads, and controls all the operational actions in the prevention service phase with the integration of citizens in a common effort and meet the training-educational aspect of children and to prevent youth crime, in line with guidelines issued by the Superintendent. Also, he applies public policy on rescuing the affected communities by groups linked to drug trafficking that took control of the perimeters of the public and private housing projects.

== Divisions and bureaus ==
All divisions and bureaus are under the command of both the Superintendent and the Auxiliary Superintendent of Field Operations.

=== Criminal Investigation Corps ===
Formed in the early 1970s, this unit has been in charge of investigating crimes in Puerto Rico. Its agents are mostly veteran officers or young officers who recently graduated from the academy. All 13 police regions in Puerto Rico have this bureau. Most of its cases have been from robberies and homicides. The bureau's divisions include:

- Homicide Division
- Robbery Division
- Violent Crimes Division
- Stolen Vehicles Division
- Sexual Crimes Division
- Internal Affairs Division
- Fingerprints and Photographic Division

=== Drugs Division ===
The Drugs Division is an elite unit that takes the fight to the enemy's doorstep. The officers impact the places where drug dealers sell narcotics, called Drug Points. In this hostile and dangerous environment, officers have been frequently attacked by drug point shooters, making it the highest-risk unit of the Puerto Rico Police Department. This division is also a Vice Unit that targets prostitution, illegal weapons, and other special cases.

=== Highway Patrol Bureau ===
The Highway Patrol Bureau is divided into three divisions: the Radar and Alcohol Detection Unit, the Expressway Patrol Unit, and the Metro Rail Unit. The first two divisions share the same primary objectives of preventing and investigating traffic accidents, arresting drunk drivers, arresting street racers, and confiscating vehicles used for street racing. The Metro Rail Unit specifically protects the San Juan Metropolitan Area Rail System, or "Tren Urbano" in Spanish.

=== Joint Forces of Rapid Action ===
The Joint Forces of Rapid Action —Spanish: Fuerzas Unidas de Rápida Acción (FURA)— is a bureau that coordinates and leads all strategies to fight the trafficking of drugs, narcotics, illegal weapons and illegal aliens. Specialized divisions within the bureau include: Air Support, Divers, Rescue, S.W.A.T., K-9 and Horseback units. The Bureau also coordinates with US federal agencies to fight crime.

=== Motorized Impact Unit ===
The Motorized Impact Unit is a subdivided unit that comes from the Traffic Bureau and the Tactical Operations Unit. Deployed on motorcycles with the blue uniform and D.O.T. patch, unit members are easily identified. They are the first on the scene of a riot, taking control of the situation until the main D.O.T. squads arrive.

=== Organized Crime Bureau ===
The Organized Crime Bureau conducts strategic research in the field of organized crime in Puerto Rico.

=== Robbery and Bank Fraud Division ===
Organized in 1982, this division investigates robbery and fraud attempts committed against companies dedicated to the storage or custody of money or valuables. The division also coordinates the Amber alert system and investigates all kidnappings.

=== Security and Protection Office ===
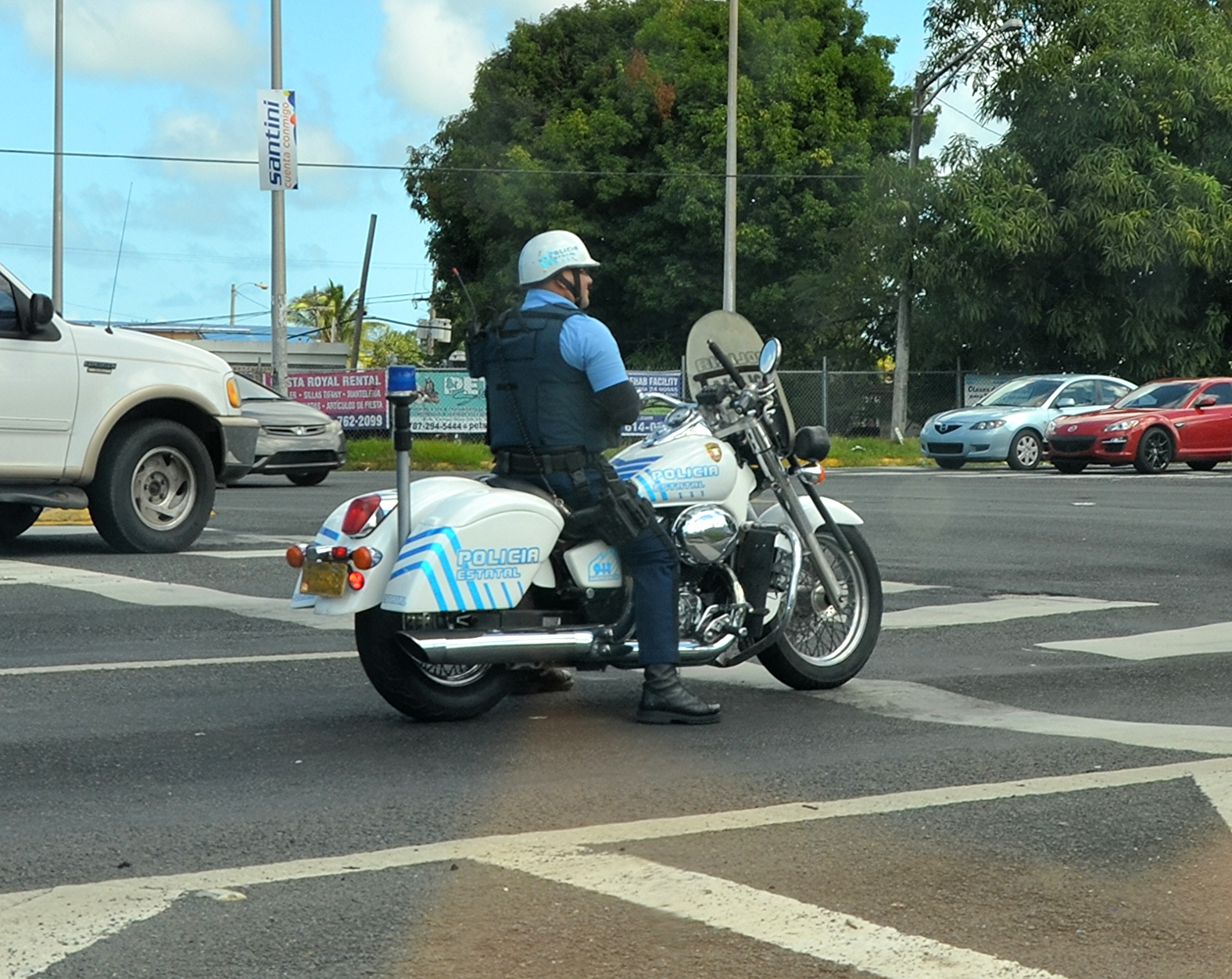
An officer on a motorcycle in 2013 (The lettering on the bike reads Policia Estatal).

This unit is the Dignitary Protective Services Division of the Puerto Rico Police Department. They have been charged with protecting the Governor of Puerto Rico and his family, the Secretary of State, the Police Superintendent, the President of the Senate, and the Speaker of the House. Additionally, they protect the Resident Commissioner, Puerto Rico's only representative in the U.S. Congress, as well as other visiting government dignitaries, U.S. and foreign. They have also been charged with investigating individuals who apply for security guard licenses on the island, as well as certain individuals requesting a concealed carry permit. O.S.P. officers dress in plain clothes, usually dark suits, and wear a small gold circular lapel pin. If studied closely, it can be seen that this pin is the agent's badge.

Uniformed agents are also assigned to the office. These agents have been mostly assigned to motorcycle units, and as advance agents.

Agents assigned to this division have been trusted with the protection of the most important government officials on the island. Thus, most of the agents on the unit came from SWAT, Tactical Operations, Criminal Investigations Corps (CIC), Homicide Detectives and the PRPD Highway Patrol.

=== Special Arrest and Extraditions Division ===
This division has been in charge of:

- pursuit and capture of all suspects in the "Most Wanted List" determined by the Auxiliary Superintendent of Strategic Operations;
- investigation of cases designated as of special interest to the Auxiliary Superintendent in Criminal Investigations;
- compliance with all arrest warrants expelled to all suspects who have committed crimes in cities outside the San Juan Metropolitan Area and have moved outside Puerto Rico.

=== Tactical Operations Division ===
The Tactical Operations Division (TOD) —commonly called Fuerza de Choque (Shock Force)— is a well-known unit within the Puerto Rico Police. Its "hands-on" tactics for crowd control, the unit's primary mission, have been infamous among Puerto Ricans, most noticeably where physical control of large gatherings of people is necessary to prevent disorder or to restore order. Fuerza de Choque's historic manner in dealing with crowd-control situations throughout its years of service has earned it criticism and complaints about civil-rights violations.

Litigation and legislation during the past years have brought improvements to the division's control techniques, reducing complaints and injuries, while improving its public image. Title 42 of the United States Code (Section 14141) prohibits law enforcement officers from depriving individuals of rights protected by U.S. law.

Members of the D.O.T. are selected, from the main police force, based on their reputation of being hard-working, tolerant, and patient officers, not easily provoked or over-zealous. Besides having the leadership traits of a model, modern police officer, Fuerza-de-Choque candidates must meet the minimum height requirement of 5 feet 10 inches (1.78 m) or be talented in martial arts or another form of self-defense. Besides crowd and riot control duties, Fuerza de Choque officers perform search and rescue, disaster, and directed patrol operations. Its membership may be found within the ranks of the regular police force (patrol/investigations) as well as in full-time SWAT teams. Fuerza de Choque’s mission of crowd control has been the same throughout its service history, and it could be loosely characterized as successful; therefore, the unit remains an important resource to police field commanders throughout Puerto Rico.

== Resources ==
=== Air support ===
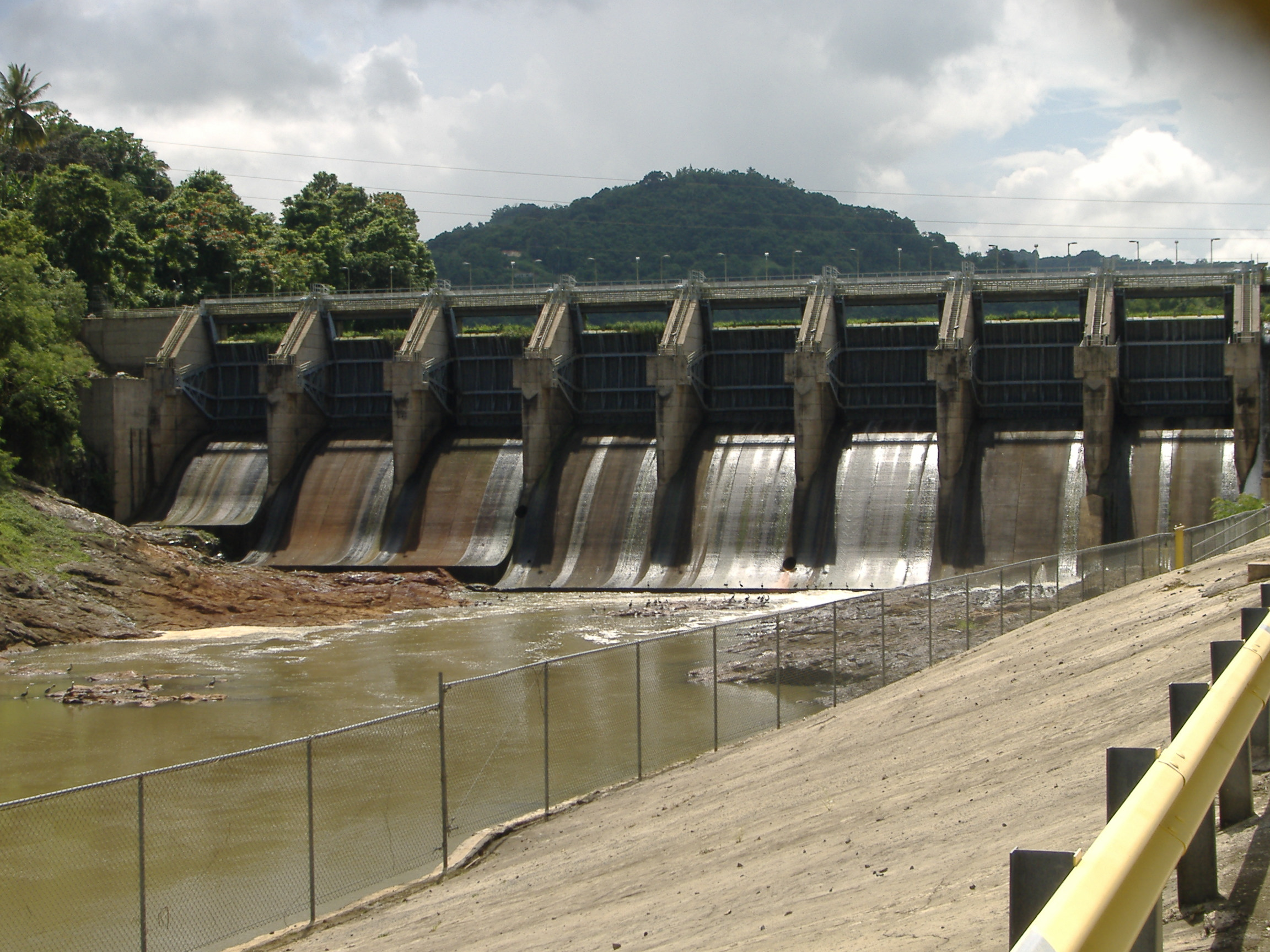
The place of the crash of the MD500E-N126PD

The Aerial Services of the Puerto Rico Police Department are operated by F.U.R.A. known in Spanish as Fuerzas Unidas de Rapida Accion (Joint Forces of Rapid Action). Its mission is to identify, intercept, detain and seize ships or boats with their crews, whose intention is to promote drug trafficking, weapons smuggling or human trafficking. It also provides air support to the ground units.

The aerial services unit dates back to 1963, when the air unit was stationed at Isla Grande Airport. Its fleet at that time consisted of Fairchild Hiller FH-1100 and OH-23 Raven helicopters.

In 1986, the unit was integrated to form the FURA. The fleet was changed to MBB/Kawasaki BK 117, MD 500 and Bell 206 helicopters. The BK117s were "state of the art" in equipment for police patrol missions; one of the helicopters had weather radar and full IFR capability. The Puerto Rico police became one of the first air units in the U.S. to operate a large BK117 fleet on police missions. The BK117 helicopters are no longer in use, and most were auctioned off in recent years.

On December 31, 1986, a fire occurred at the Dupont Plaza Hotel. People fled to the roof of the hotel to escape the fire, which had started in the hotel's casino. The PR Police air unit responded with the MD 500 series helicopter, unit N5231G. Lt. Julio Colón, the pilot, landed the helicopter on the roof of the 17-floor hotel, with just one skid in contact. Space limitations of the roof structure prevented a more stable contact with both skids.

In the mid-1990s, the air unit received one MD 520N NOTAR system, tail number N128PD. Also, one Beechcraft Super King Air, from the program High Intensity Drug Trafficking Area. This aircraft has the same equipment as United States Customs Service aircraft. The primary mission is monitoring of drug trafficking. Today, the King Air is "not airworthy".

On July 26, 1993, MD Helicopters MD 500 N126PD "S/N 0499E", was on patrol when it collided with a cable wire with fatal consequences. The accident occurred when the helicopter struck a high-voltage wire, not having reached the necessary height to avoid hitting them. The helicopter caught fire instantly and the remains landed near some gates of Carraízo Dam in Trujillo Alto. Every time when opening the floodgates of the Loiza river, a helicopter had flown over the place warning to fishermen to evacuate the area. Today this type of flight is prohibited.

Helicopter crew:

- Pilot in command- Jose Ramon Bonilla Gonzalez, 54
- Co-Pilot-William Colon Burgos, 30
- Tactical flight observer- Edgardo Gutierrez Colon, 32

In 1995 the Puerto Rico Air Unit received five Bell OH-58 Kiowa from U.S. Army Donation. The OH-58C are Demilitarized ("demilitarized" means converted to non-military use or purpose, returned to a civilian field.) Today, this fleet of OH-58C is "Not Airworthy".

In 2000, the air unit received three brand-new helicopters, Bell 407 tail number N137PD and N311DJ, one Bell 412 tail number N136PD. The Bell 412 was equipped "multi-mission" with rescue cable.

In 2006, FURA received two new Bell 407 tail number N139PD and N138PD helicopters with new Wescam technology, including more powerful searchlights and heat-seeking monitors that it can use to search for a person under any obstacle; also, it received a telephoto camera that can see a license plate very clearly from 4,000 feet (1,200 m) in the air. The system are capable of transmitting live image to ground units.

In 2007, police superintendent Pedro Toledo, had plans to buy a blimp for use in the fight against drug trafficking. Purchase never materialized because of the high cost of maintenance.

In December 2008, the air unit lost a Cessna 172 on the west side of the island. They were on patrol, looking for suspicious vessel approaching the coast; suddenly the engine shut down. They were forced to make an emergency landing on the shores of Añasco. Three crew escape uninjured.

Today the Puerto Rico police dept. fleet consists of 3 bell 429, 3 bell 407(one of them GX) and a Baron twin engine airplane.

- The air division divides in two districts: Northeastern and Southwestern. The Northeastern district is based at Isla Grande Airport and runs from Aguadilla to Yabucoa, the Southwestern district is based at Mercedita Airport and runs from Maunabo to Rincon.

The Aerial Services duties range from giving air support to ground units and coastal patrol, to Search and Rescue and SWAT exercises.

=== Communications ===
The Communications Division consists of four sections: 1. Trucking systems and Microwave, 2. Special Services, 3. Telephone, and Radio Workshop. Each region of enforcement has people from these sections providing the department with communication support.

The Puerto Rico Police radio communications are on VHF, UHF and 800 MHz.

Trunked radio system was upgraded to P-25 phase 1 Atlas with 20 towers to converge all island There is also systems interoperability, capable of communication in VHF, UHF, 700 MHz, 800 MHz and P-25 on the VHF, UHF, 700 MHz, 800 MHz.

Also, the 13 police regions runs a trunk 800 MHz digital system. Backup VHF system with 13 repeaters around the island.

Also with more disaggregated data and communications centers as follows: 13 control centers, one in each Region Police, a Command Center in Fura and Radio Control Center that is responsible for monitoring all Regions and Units of the Police of Puerto Rico And coordinates internal and external resources.

Puerto Rico Police use the Ten-code on police radio communication.

=== Ground transportation ===
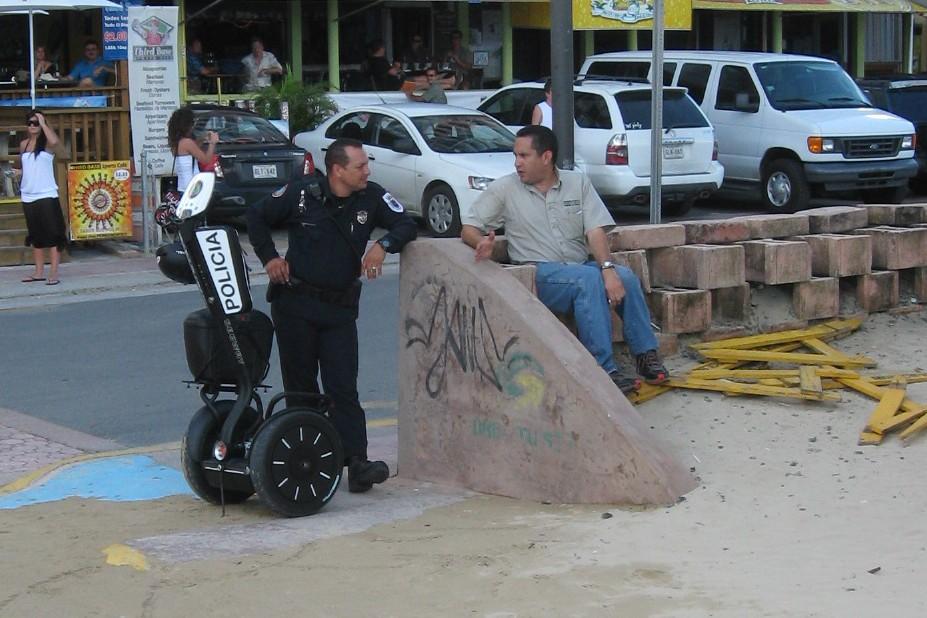
Police officer talking with someone in Carolina

During its early years, the PRPD used horses, Harley Davidson motorcycles and Jeeps to patrol downtown and tourism areas. Horses were also used to patrol mountainous areas. In 1955 the fleet consisted of motorcycles, Volkswagen Beetles, and military jeeps. In the mid-1960s, Governor Roberto Sánchez Vilella changed the fleet to the Plymouth Fury.

By 1985, the ground patrol fleet consisted of the Plymouth Gran Fury, Ford LTD Crown Victoria and confiscated vehicles, converted into either marked or unmarked police vehicles, until the late 1980s. During the administration of Pedro Rosselló, the fleet switched to the Ford Crown Victoria Police Interceptor. Other vehicles in the new fleet included the Jeep Cherokee, Mitsubishi Montero and Chevrolet Caprice.

Patrol cars have had several different color schemes. They were originally painted dark blue, with white on the front doors and top (see image at right), showing the department logo on the front doors. A blue, rotating code-3 light bar was mounted on the roof. Unmarked vehicles used a single rotating light inside the car.

In 1998, the vehicles and colors of the patrol car fleet changed. The new fleet consisted of the Ford Crown Victoria Police Interceptor, Mitsubishi Montero, Chevrolet Camaro, Ford Mustang, Honda Police CB500P, Harley Davidson Electra Glide, Ford Excursion and Ford Expedition (these last two only for SWAT). The new color scheme was a white base all over the car, with two color lines, blue and yellow crossed, running along the side (see image below). From the rear of the car to its midpoint, the blue line ran above the yellow line. At the midpoint, the blue line crossed behind the yellow line, placing the blue line below the yellow line from there to the front tire. The logo was on the front doors. "Emergencia 9-1-1" (Emergency 9-1-1) was marked on each side at the rear of the car. Vehicle unit numbers were placed near the front door, just over the edge of the front tires on both sides; also on the roof, behind the light bar.

Governor Sila M. Calderon integrated the Ford Explorer and the Ford Taurus into the fleet in 2003, replacing the Mitsubishi Montero and Jeep Cherokee, although specialized units continued using some of these older models. The Ford Mustang replaced the Chevrolet Camaro and the Honda Shadow motorcycle replaced Honda Police CB500P motorcycle. Harley Davidson Electra Glide motorcycles remained in service, but were assigned only to veteran motorcycle patrol officers and the governor's escort. This was also when LED light bars were introduced to the fleet, on the Chevrolet Impala cars assigned only to the Public Residential Security Corps.

A minor change in the paint scheme in 2003 was applied only to Highway Patrol vehicles; the blue line continued over the yellow line from rear to front, without intersecting, but with a curve toward the front door. Search lights were mounted on each side of the light bar on the roof, and also on the front sides. The PRPD logo was placed on the left side of the front door, rather than being centered on the door, while the highway patrol logo was centered on the rear doors.

A newer model of the Ford Crown Victoria Police Interceptor jointed the fleet in 2008, along with the Chevrolet Trailblazer. A new paint job was applied a month after the new vehicles arrived, but it affected only the Ford Crown Victoria cars. The new design started with a white base color, then yellow was painted on the first half down on each side, dark blue was painted on the middle on each side, leaving the white base on the hood, top and back of the car.

The logo was put on the front door in the upper left corner or right corner, depending on the side. "Policia" (Police) was painted in white on the dark blue area of the front doors. The motto, "Proteccion, Integridad" (Protection and Integrity) was painted in white on the dark blue area of the back doors. On the yellow area, the name of the precinct, district or specialized unit was marked in dark blue. On the back end of each side, "Emergencia 9-1-1" was painted in white on the dark blue area. The back of the vehicle was marked with the patrol number, plus 9-1-1 and "Policia". The patrol unit number was also applied to the top of each vehicle.

The light bar on the 2008 Interceptors was a blue LED with two search lights, mounted on the left and right of the bar. A double search light was placed in the middle front.

The Ford Explorer was replaced by the Chevrolet Trailblazer for patrol duties, but many specialized units still use the Explorer.

In July 2009, the Highway Patrol division received the newest fleet of Dodge Charger for its Expressway Division, replacing the Ford Crown Victoria Police Interceptor. These vehicles have a gray base color, with the logo in the middle of the front door and the words Autopistas (Expressway) and "Highway Patrol" under the logo.

On the back side of the trunk is the logo of the Puerto Rico Department of Transportation and Public Works, in a smaller size. A blue LED light bar is mounted inside the vehicle; it has two light bars in the front with two searchlights on its sides, and one complete light bar in the back. The purpose of the new patrol car is to be what it calls a Patrulla Fantasma or Ghost Patrol Car. It surprises speeders by pretending to be a government vehicle of the Puerto Rico Department of Transportation and Public Works.

The Freeway Division of the Highway Patrol received the latest generation of Ford Crown Victoria Police Interceptor. It has a gray base color, but the PPR logo is located only on the middle of the front door and without the logo of the Department of Transportation. A blue LED light bar is mounted inside the car, exactly the same as the new Expressway patrol cars. It plays the same role, Patrullas Fantasmas (Ghost Patrol).

After a poll with citizens and police personnel, the results show that public respect for officers suffered from the use of the yellow, blue and white color paint scheme referred to by officers as "Poli-Taxis".

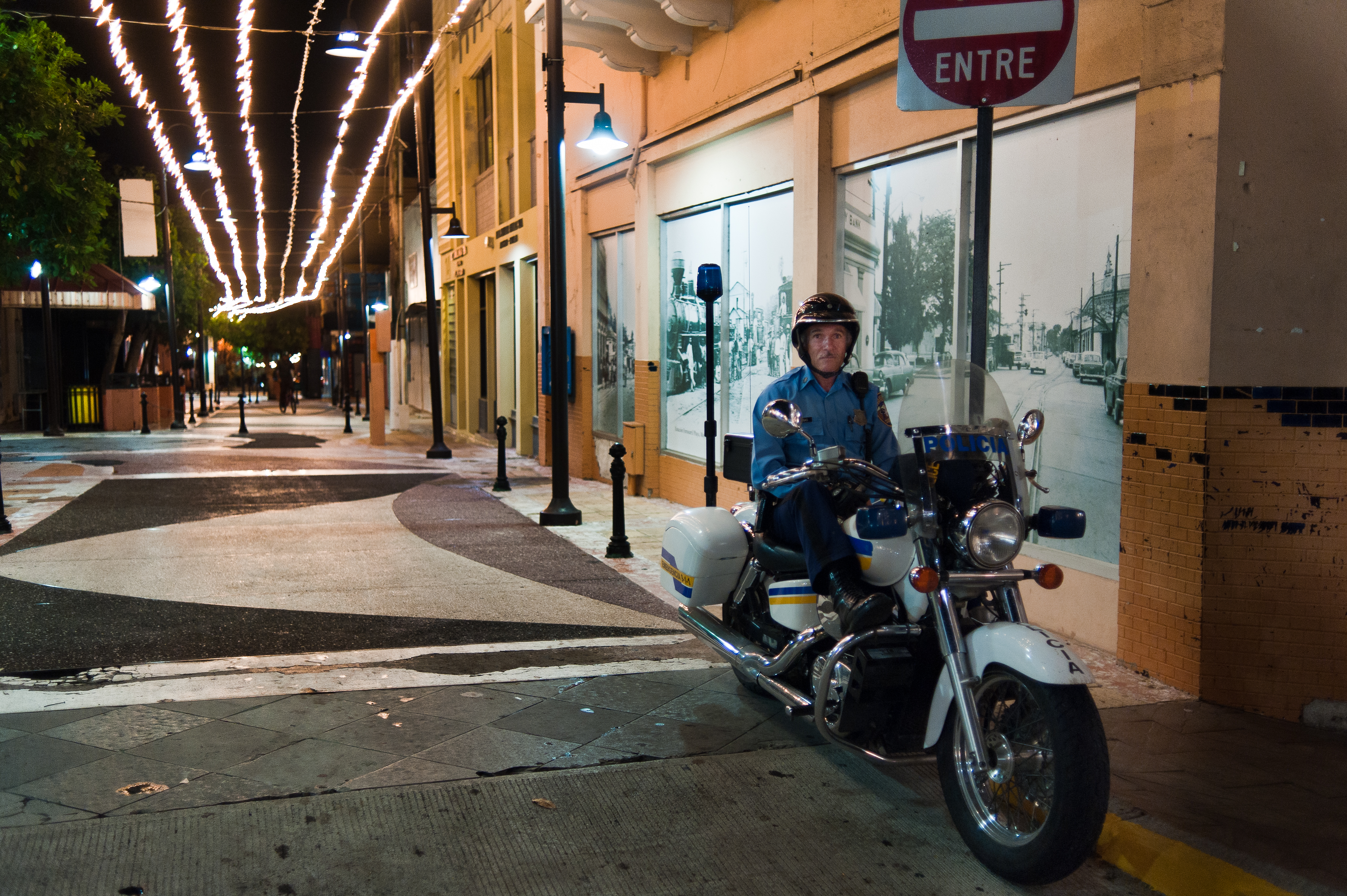
Police officer on a motorcycle in October, 2010

On January 25, 2010, the fleet was completely changed, especially the patrol units serving the precincts and districts. The department bought 47 Chevrolet Tahoe cars in 2010 at a cost of $1.2 million of U.S. funds. This will completely replace the remaining Mitsubishi Montero and Ford Explorers patrolling the street for specialized units. It also bought Suzuki model 8000 motorcycles to replace the Honda Shadow.

The Ford Crown Victoria with the yellow, blue and white colors ("Poli-Taxis") will be repainted. Its new colors will be dark blue with reflective white lines on the back, sides and hood, the word "Policia" on each side, the logo on the back and upper sides, and "Emergencia 9-1-1" on the back window and back sides. Motorcycles will have the same paint, but with new blue LED lights on the back and front. Also, the maritime fleet and Air Fleet will also have a "makeover". These changes were forecast to be on the streets of Puerto Rico by early February 2010. The units of Autopistas (Highway Patrol) and Transito (Transit) with the gray base color and logo on the sides will not be affected by the color change.

Old patrol car in the 1960s, with Puerto Rico Governor Roberto Sánchez Vilella.

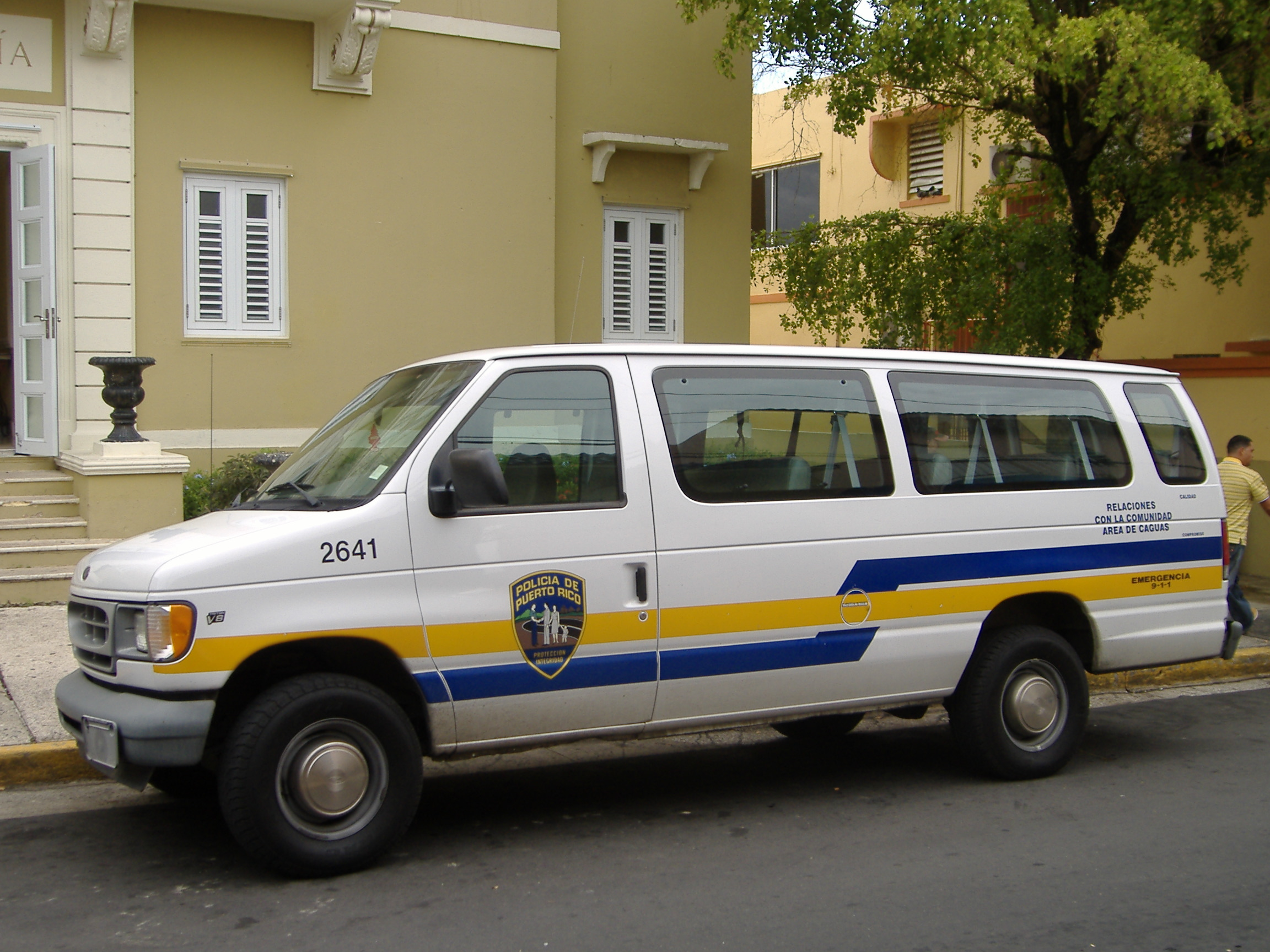
Puerto Rico Police transport van.

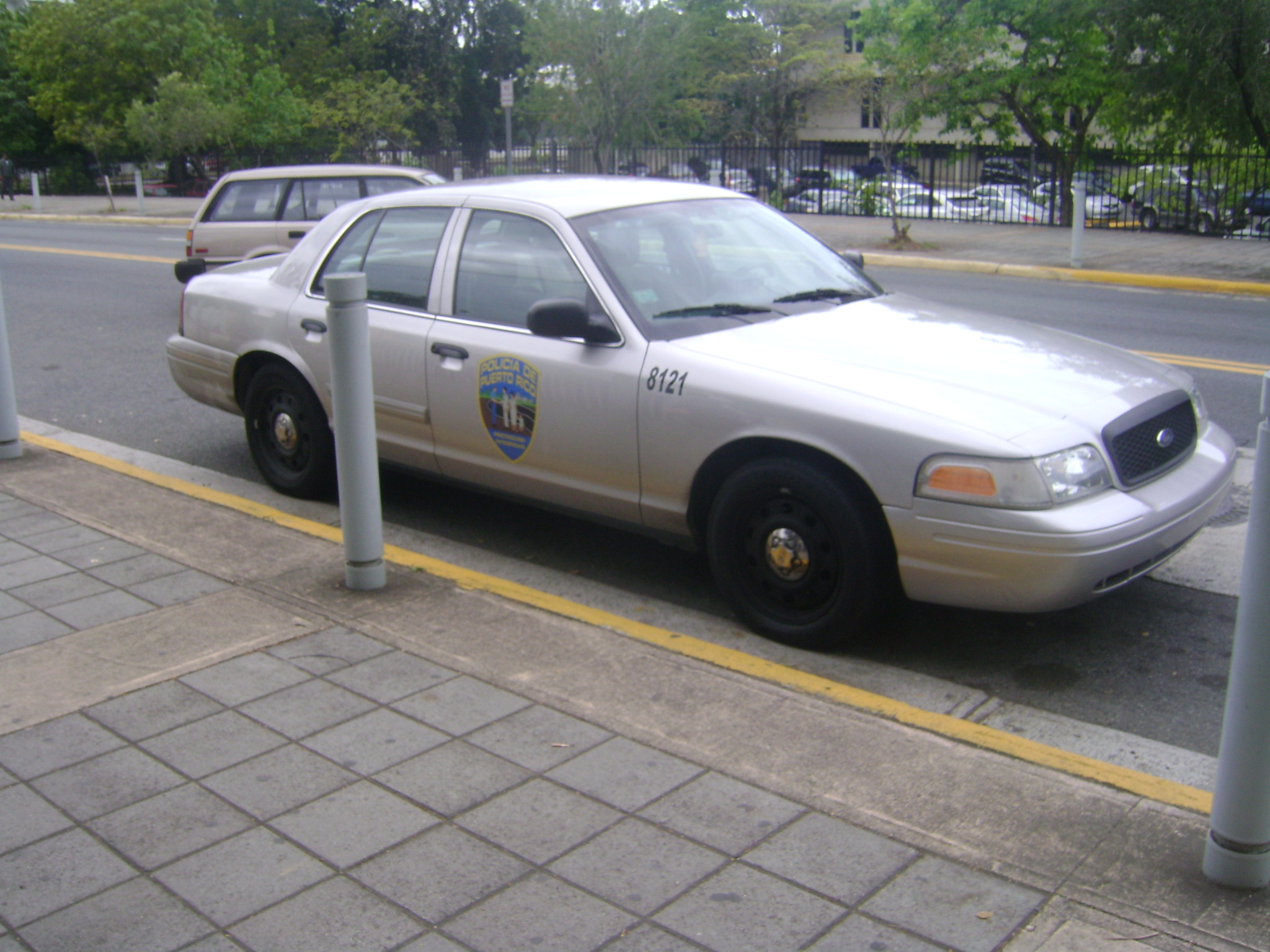
PRPD Ford Crown Victoria from the "Ghost Fleet"

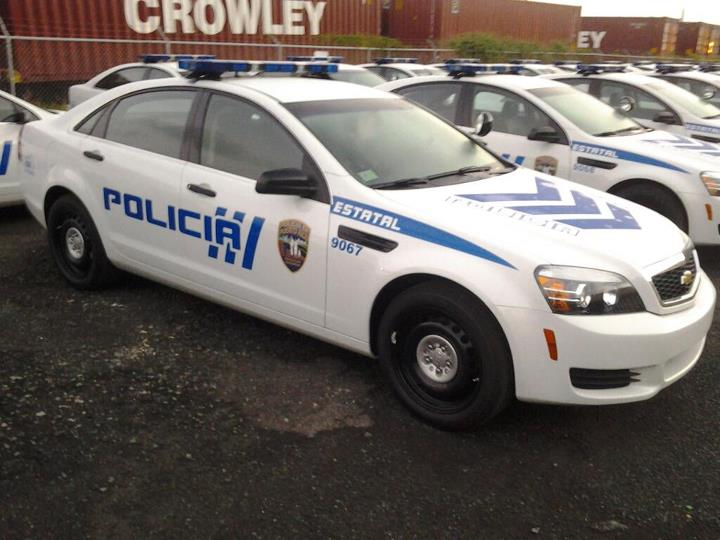
Chevrolet Caprice 2012

=== Uniforms ===
The Puerto Rico police uniforms have changed in style and color over the years. The PRPD uniform of the 1930s was a long-sleeve, navy blue button shirt, with a gun belt about the waist and support crossing the chest. Navy blue pants had a black line on the side of the legs from the waist down. In the 1960s, the only change to the uniform was the gun belt. The strap for the gun was only at the waist. In that same year, the patch was the Great Seal of Puerto Rico under the name Policia de Puerto Rico (Police of Puerto Rico).

Later, in the late 1980s, the uniform was changed to a short-sleeve, light-blue button shirt. The police patch changed to an image of a police officer saluting a family, near a road, with the view of the city and the mountains. This patch is still in use.

In 2004, the patch was changed to an image of a man and woman dressed as police officers, with the U.S. and Puerto Rico flags behind, with the city and a garita or watch tower also behind. This patch is less popular with the force and not worn as often as the previous patch.

The uniform in current use is the light-blue shirt, with long or short sleeves and navy blue pants, with the black line on the side of the legs from waist down. Lieutenants, captains, inspectors and colonels have used either light-blue button shirts or white button shirts.

Officer headgear is either a black peaked cap or black police stetson. The cap has a wreath of wealth with number.

Specialized units, such as the Mounted police, wear the light-blue shirts, but reserve the long sleeves for ceremonies, wearing the short sleeves or the navy blue long sleeve shirt that says Policia (Police) on the back and the arms for coastal patrol. The pants have a yellow line instead of a black line on the sides and are worn with riding boots.

=== Weapons and equipment ===
==== Lethal ====
- Smith & Wesson Model 10 (no longer in use)
- Smith & Wesson Model 28
- Smith & Wesson Model 686
- Smith & Wesson M&P
- Smith & Wesson Model 5906
- Glock 22
- SIG Sauer P320 9mm (main service weapon)
- SIG Sauer SIG516 (10.5” 5.56 NATO)
- M-14
- Remington 870

==== Non-lethal ====
- Taser gun
- Plastic bullet gun
- Blank gun
- Straight stick
- PR-24 side-handle baton
- Expandable baton
- Tear gas
- Pepper spray

==== Bulletproof vests ====
- Type 3A bulletproof vest
- Type 2 tactical vest

== Police regions ==
The Puerto Rico Police is regionally divided into 13 police regions to provide better service to the public. Each region has a commanding officer and 2 sub-commanding officers; one for investigation, and the other for field operations. The police regions are:

=== Aguadilla ===
- Commanding Officer- Lt. Colonel Jose Rodriguez Rivera

Located at #463 Victoria Avenue in Aguadilla, the region is in charge of protecting the northwestern tip of Puerto Rico. It covers the towns of Moca, San Sebastian, Aguada, Rincon, Isabela, Aguadilla and the Ramey ward in Aguadilla. It has one of the lowest crime-incidence rates in Puerto Rico. Since it is located in the Mona passage, the region works in union with US federal agencies, such as ATF, U.S. Department of Agriculture, and mostly with the U.S. Border Patrol. The region is composed of many specialized units, such as: OSP, DOT, DOE, Highway Patrol, FURA, CIC, SORT and Vice Unit.

=== Aibonito ===
- Commanding Officer- Lt. Colonel Carlos Cruz Burgos

The Aibonito police region is the most recent police region in Puerto Rico. Created on October 1, 2003, it covers the towns of Barranquitas, Comerío, Orocovis, Coamo and Aibonito, where the headquarters are located at #198 Julio Rosario St. This police region was in the past divided by other police regions such as Bayamón and Caguas. This area is not a "high incidence crime area" because of the geographical location; there is some incidence of crime such as drugs and breaking and entering. The major problems in the area are car accidents and carjackings. Structurally the region is composed by 5 police districts and a Police Post located in the Hayales village in Coamo. The specialized units are: Auto Thief Division, Highway Patrol, CIC, Athletic Youth League (Relations with the community), Vice Unit, and both Special and Tactical Operations Division.

=== Arecibo ===
- Commanding Officer- Lt. Colonel Roberto Rivera Miranda

With headquarters located at 300# E. Hostos Avenue in Arecibo, Puerto Rico, this region protects the towns of the northern half of Puerto Rico, serving the towns of Arecibo, Hatillo, Camuy, Quebradillas, Barceloneta, Florida, Manatí, Ciales and Morovis. Also, drug and weapons flow normally through the low-class residential neighborhoods, such as El Coto in Arecibo. But arrest modes in this area have been very successful. The region is composed of 8 police districts, 2 precincts and 2 police posts in Sabana Hoyos. Also it has specialized units such as: Highway Patrol, Maritime Division, CIC and Rescue Unit.

=== Bayamón ===
- Commanding Officer- Lt. COL. Guillermo Rivera Rosario

The Bayamón Police Region is the Puerto Rico Police Department region for the western San Juan Metropolitan Area and the one half of northern Puerto Rico.

It is composed of the towns of: Cataño, Corozal, Dorado, Guaynabo, Naranjito, Toa Alta, Toa Baja, Vega Alta, Vega Baja and Bayamón. This last one is where the regional headquarters are located at #200 State Road PR-28 in the Luchetti Industrial Park.

The precincts that compose the Bayamón region are: North Bayamón, West Bayamón, South Bayamón, Juan Domingo (Guaynabo), Levittown (Toa Baja), and Cedro arriba, Naranjito.

This region, in crime-related terms, is turning to a highly criminal area, specifically between west Bayamón and Toa Baja; this area is controlled in the drug world by drug lord Angelo M. Ayala, better known as "Angelo Millones". In the beginning of the summer of 2009, a bloody massacre left 3 people dead, one of them was a 17-year-old kid. Since then, US federal authorities such as DEA and ATF, and state agencies as P.R.P.D. and N.I.E. have been at war with this man. He has been one of the most wanted men in Puerto Rico by state and federal agencies. The Bayamón police region is structurally composed of 9 police precincts and 7 police districts. It also has specialized units as: Auto Thief Division, CIC, Highway Patrol, Tactical Operations Division, Special Operations Division and Vice Unit.

=== Caguas ===
- Commanding Officer- Lt. Colonel Jorge Luyando

The Caguas Police Region is the police region for the central-eastern part of Puerto Rico. The region is composed by the towns of: San Lorenzo, Juncos, Aguas Buenas, Cidra, Gurabo and Caguas, this last one is where region headquarters are located at José Mercado Avenue and the corner Cristobal Colón Street. The area is also where the main campus of the Puerto Rico Criminal Justice College (Puerto Rico Police Department Academy) is located, in the town of Gurabo. The region is structurally composed of six police districts. It also has specialized units such as: Highway Patrol, Tactical Operations Division, Auxiliary Police, Special Operations Division and CIC.

=== Carolina ===
- Commanding Officer- Col. Antonio Lopez Figueroa

Located east of San Juan, the Carolina police region serves the eastern part of the San Juan Metropolitan Area, and most of the towns on the northeastern part of Puerto Rico. This region covers the towns of Canóvanas, Loiza, Trujillo Alto and Carolina, making this last one as command center. Their command offices are located at 214 W. Arzuaga St. in the downtown area of Carolina. This area protects the Luis Muñoz Marín International Airport, as well as many hotels and tourist sites. Most of criminal activity is located in the areas between east Carolina, Loiza and west of Canóvanas. The Carolina police region has many specialized units, as Highway Patrol, Tactical Operations Division, CIC, FURA maritime and horseback division, and Turistic Police.

=== Fajardo ===
- Commanding Officer- Col. Juan Rodriguez Dávila

Created on September 6, 1997, the Fajardo police region is composed by the towns in the eastern tip of Puerto Rico, including the island-municipalities of Viques and Culebra. The towns covered by this region are: Luquillo, Ceiba, Rio Grande, Vieques, Culebra and Fajardo. Their headquarters are located at #99 E. Victoria St. in Fajardo, Puerto Rico. A significant distinction of this region from the 13 other regions in Puerto Rico, is the protection and enforcement of the island-municipalities of Vieques (located 16 miles or 26 kilometres east of Puerto Rico), and Culebra (17 miles east of Puerto Rico). Because of the islands' distance from Puerto Rico, they are easy places for drug connections from South America and North America. This is why most of these areas are protected with a coordination of U.S. Federal Agencies, such as the Drug Enforcement Administration (D.E.A.) and the Bureau of Alcohol, Tobacco, Firearms and Explosives (A.T.F.). It has 5 police districts, 1 police post located at the village of Palmer in Rio Grande, it also has many specialist units such as Highway Patrol, Vice Unit, Special Operation and Tactical Operations Division, Maritime division, Transportation, Community Relations and Auto Theft Division.

=== Guayama ===
- Commanding Officer- Lt. Colonel Miguel Colon March

The Guayama police region is the Puerto Rico Police region for the southeastern half of Puerto Rico. It covers the towns of: Salinas, Cayey, Patillas, Arroyo and Guayama. This last one is where the regional headquarters are located at Jose M. Torres Avenue, South Detour. The region evolved from the police regions of Ponce and Humacao in the late 1980s. Mostly composed of farm communities and small urban areas, the region has been 9th in criminal activity. It is structurally composed of 5 police districts. The region has different specialized units. It has CIC (Criminal Investigations Corps), two Highway Patrol stations, two maritime unit stations, Auto Thief Division, Tactical Operations Division, Community Relations, Drug and Weapons Unit (Vice Unit) and a shooting range.

=== Humacao ===
- Commanding Officer- Lt. Colonel Manuel De Jesus Treskow

The Humacao police region is the Puerto Rico Police Department region for the southeastern part of Puerto Rico. It covers the towns of: Naguabo, Yabucoa, Las Piedras, Maunabo and Humacao. This last one is where the regional headquarters are located at the corner of State Road 908 and Boire Street. This region is one of the first 4 regions established under law #77 of June 22, 1956. The region was quiet, but also with criminal activity not as dangerous as the San Juan Metropolitan Area. The region is structurally composed of 5 police districts; it also has specialized units such as: Highway Patrol, Tactical Operations Division, Vice Unit, Auto Thief, Community Relations, Special Operations Division and CIC.

=== Mayagüez ===
- Commanding Officer- Lt. Colonel Jose Rodriguez Torres

With their headquarters located at Corazones Avenue in Mayagüez, the Mayagüez police region serves the towns of the western and southwestern tip of Puerto Rico. Those towns are: Mayagüez, Añasco, Las Marias, Maricao, Sabana Grande, Hormigueros, San German, Cabo Rojo and Lajas. This region very well known for the arrival of undocumented immigrants from the Dominican Republic who cross the Mona Passage. For that reason, the whole of western Puerto Rico is protected by a combination of US agencies such as the US Border Patrol and DEA. The Mayagüez police region its composed by two precincts (North Mayagüez and South Mayagüez), 8 police districts and 1 police post located at the Boqueron Village in Cabo Rojo. Also it has specialized units such as: O.S.P. Security and Protection Office, Special Operations Division, Vice Unit, Illegal Weapons Division, Tactical Operations Division, Highway Patrol, S.O.R.T. Team (Special Operations Response Team), as well as Horseback and Maritime division from FURA.

=== Ponce ===
- Commanding Officer- Lt. Colonel Edwin Torres Ortiz

The Ponce Region is the second-largest police region of Puerto Rico. It covers the towns of Yauco, Juana Díaz, Santa Isabel, Villalba, Peñuelas, Guayanilla, Guanica and Ponce. Its headquarters were located at 500 Hostos Avenue in the city of Ponce, but on 23 February 2011 it inaugurated new facilities in sector Vallas Torres, near Urbanizacion Los Caobos, at the intersection of PR-1 and PR-52. The Ponce Regional Headquarters have been outfitted to serve as alternate operational headquarters of the Puerto Rico Police in the event that an emergency or crisis renders the San Juan headquarters inoperable. It is currently also the backup site for the Puerto Rico Police electronic records databases. The region is composed of five precincts, six police districts, the southern headquarters of FURA including its maritime division located in the port of Ponce, and an aerial division located at Mercedita Airport. Precincts located in the municipality of Ponce are located at:

- Comandancia Ponce (Headquarters) - Avenida Los Caobos & Calle Cidra, Ponce (00716)
- 158 Villa - Calle Villa & Calle Central, Ponce (00728);
- 258 Playa - Calle Principal & Calle B, Ponce (00728);
- 358 El Tuque - Avenida Punto Oro, Ponce (00728);
- 458 La Rambla - Calle Yaguez & Calle La Plata, Ponce (00730);
- 558 Morel Campos - Urb Morel Campos, Calle Buen Humor, Ponce (00728).

From at least the 1935 until the early 1970s, the Ponce Municipal operated from their headquarters at Calle Molina, at the lot between Calle Vives and Calle Sol streets. Prior to being Puerto Rico (Insular) Police Headquarters for Ponce, the building on Calle Molina street had been the city's matadero. From the 1970s to 2000s, the Puerto Rico Police, Ponce Area, operated from a new headquarters building at the southeast corner of Avenida Las Americas and Avenida Hostos.

=== San Juan (capital) ===
- Commanding Officer- Lt. Col. Juan Caceres Mendez

The most populated area in Puerto Rico, the capital is an area with a high crime incidence. With regional offices located at the Puerta de Tierra district in the San Juan Islet, this police region is composed of only the city of San Juan. The majority of sworn officers of the Puerto Rico Police Department work in the San Juan Region precincts and specialized divisions. San Juan has 11 precincts protecting its residents and visitors. The home of the Puerto Rico Police Department Headquarters, located in the West Hato Rey district, houses the rest of the specialized units; it is also home for the FURA air station in Isla Grande Airport. The specialized units have included: FURA, Highway Patrol, CIC, Auto Thief Division, Special Operations Division, Tactical Operations Division, Community Relations Division, Domestic Violence Division, Special Arrest Division, Public Integrity Division, Internal Affairs, Port Police and the Office of Security and Protection (protection for the governor and his family). The following are the precincts comprising the San Juan region.

- 166th Puerta de Tierra/Old San Juan
- 266th Santurce
- 366th Loiza St.
- 466th Barrio Obrero
- 382nd West Hato Rey
- 182nd East Hato Rey
- 282nd Puerto Nuevo
- 362nd Monte Hatillo
- 162nd Rio Piedras
- 262nd Cupey
- 462nd Caimito

=== Utuado ===
- Commanding Officer- Lt. William Mangual Rosado

Serving an estimated 106,000 inhabitants divided into 4 towns, the Utuado Police Region is the biggest police region in Puerto Rico, in terms of geographical terrain. It serves the towns of Lares, Jayuya, Adjuntas and Utuado, with region headquarters located at #11 Gubermental St. in Utuado. The region is structurally divided into: 5 precincts (Lares, Castañer, Utuado, Angeles and Mameyes), and two police districts (Jayuya and Adjuntas). The region has had many specialized units, including: Cycle Patrol, Highway Patrol, Tactical Operations Division, Domestic Violence Unit and CIC.

== Controversies ==
=== Death of Miguel Cáceres ===
On August 11, 2007, Tactical Operations Division officer Javier Pagán Cruz shot and killed a community sports leader identified, Miguel A. Cáceres. The incident occurred when Miguel stopped traffic at an intersection of State Road PR-3 to let a motorcade of a quincieañera pass. When police were passing by to investigate the situation, officer Págan questioned Miguel about his actions. Págan determined that he was in violation of the law including insulting a female officer. He proceeded to arrest him, but Miguel resisted arrest. Miguel was on the floor resisting, while Págan and two more officers beat him. When Págan went for his gun Miguel was already restrained and begged for his life. The gun discharged, killing Miguel instantly, but officer Págan continued shooting him. The whole scene was captured on video. Carlos Sustache and Zulma Díaz de Léon, the two officers present at the scene of the crime, were discharged from the Humacao Tactical Operations Division while officer Págan is serving a 109-year sentence for the crime.

=== Federal investigations ===
In September 2010, the FBI conducted raids across Puerto Rico, arresting many members of the PRPD and other local police agencies as part of Operation Guard Shack.

A September 2011, United States Department of Justice (US DOJ) investigation found that the PRPD engaged in patterns of misconduct that violate the Constitution and federal law and that "the constitutional violations [that the US DOJ] uncovered are pervasive and plague all levels of PRPD." In July 2013, the Puerto Rico Police entered into an agreement with the US DOJ to implement a series of reforms.

In June 2012, the American Civil Liberties Union said "the [Puerto Rico Police Department] is steeped in a culture of unrestrained abuse and near-total impunity."

=== Racial abuse ===
While high-profile incidents receive more attention, the Justice Department said in 2011 that abuses and discriminatory policing happen on a regular basis. "Evidence suggests that PRPD officers violate the rights of individuals of Dominican descent or appearance through targeted and unjustifiable police actions," Justice Department lawyers wrote. The Justice Department highlighted several major incidents of misuse of force:

- In 2009, after a several week police presence in Villas del Sol, a Dominican squatter community in Toa Baja there was a violent confrontation, where women and children were pepper sprayed.
- In 2006, Felix Escolastico Rodriguez, a Dominican, was beaten by several officers while parking in Rio Piedras. As they attacked, an officer used racial and ethnic slurs. Escolastico reached an out-of-court settlement with the officers.

=== Planting drugs ===
In 2011 the Department of Justice reported allegations of officers planting drugs on people.

== In popular media ==
The Puerto Rican Police is showcased on The Travel Channel's reality show, Border Rico.

== Gallery ==
PRPD officers and examiners in the old command center during the 1960s

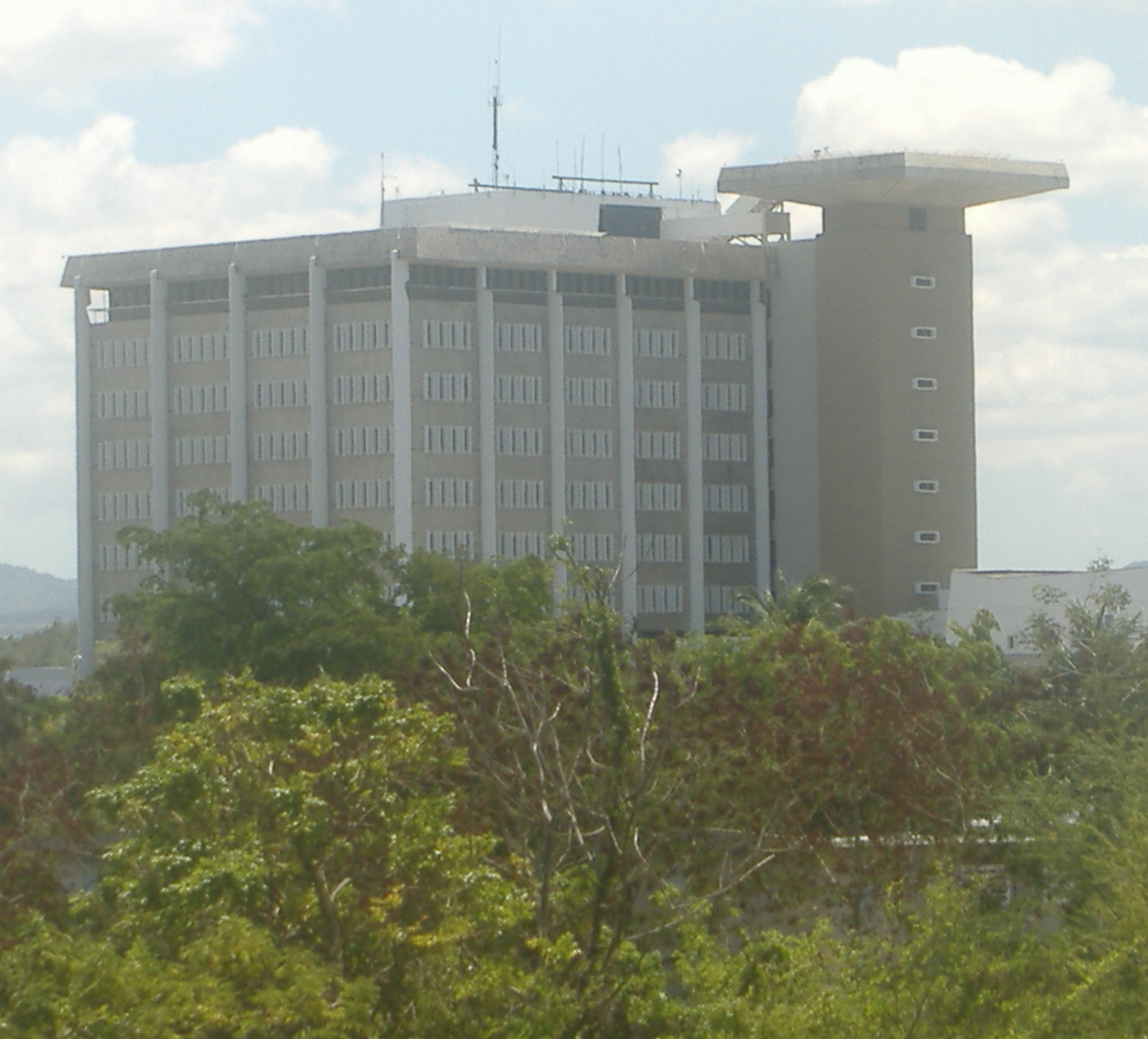
Police Headquarters in the Hato Rey district of the San Juan (2007)

PRPD officers during training (2010)

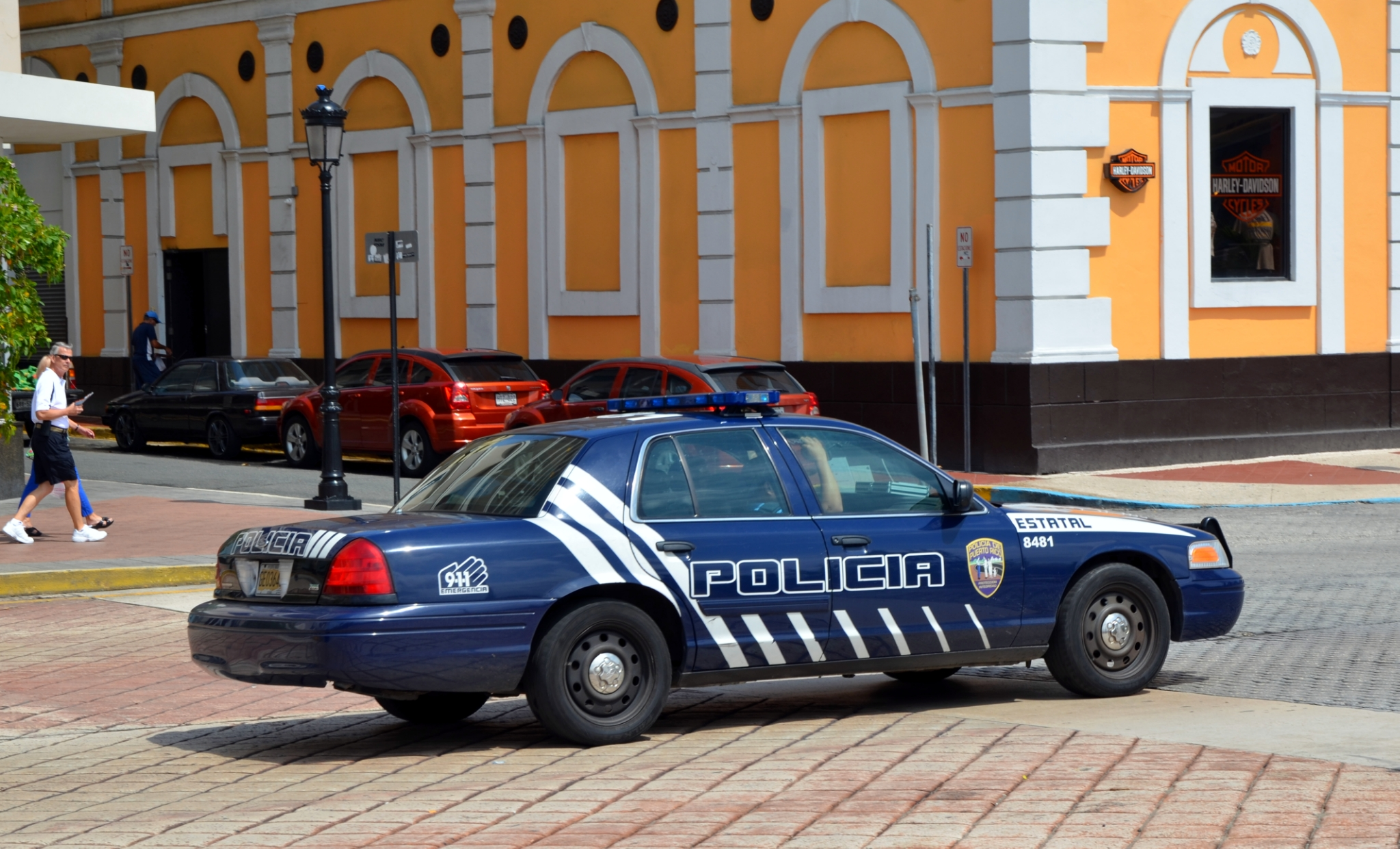
PRPD Ford Crown Victoria Police Interceptor (2013)

== See also ==
- Crime in Puerto Rico
