= List of Puerto Rico locations by per capita income =

This is a list of Puerto Rico locations by per capita income. In 2017, Puerto Rico had a per capita income of $12,081 — lower than any state and one of the lowest in the United States. In 2017, Puerto Rico had a median household income of $19,775 — the lowest of any state or territory in the United States.

Puerto Rico is the only U.S. territory whose data is recorded annually in American Community Survey estimates (as if it were a state) — the other U.S. territories have their data recorded only once every 10 years.

== Puerto Rico municipalities ranked by per capita income ==
Note: Puerto Rico does not have counties. The U.S. Census Bureau counts the 78 municipalities of Puerto Rico as county-equivalents.

Data for the municipalities of Puerto Rico is from the U.S. Census Bureau (2013-2017 American Community Survey 5-Year Estimates). Most of the municipalities of Puerto Rico are among the lowest-income places in the United States. Adjuntas, Puerto Rico has the lowest median household income of any county or county-equivalent in the United States.

Per capita income ranges from $24,264 in Guaynabo to $5,943 in Maricao.

Rank	Municipality	Per capita income (2017)	Median household income (2017)
1	Guaynabo	$24,264	$34,060
2	San Juan	$18,160	$21,677
3	Gurabo	$16,559	$32,625
4	Carolina	$16,188	$29,082
5	Trujillo Alto	$15,703	$31,202
6	Dorado	$15,495	$29,354
7	Toa Alta	$14,162	$29,672
8	Bayamón	$14,138	$25,528
9	Caguas	$13,904	$24,229
10	Cayey	$12,594	$20,442
11	Toa Baja	$12,240	$24,583
12	Ceiba	$11,840	$18,998
13	Humacao	$11,682	$18,735
14	Cataño	$11,627	$18,663
15	Hormigueros	$11,588	$19,674
16	Culebra	$11,450	$23,355
17	Vieques	$11,136	$16,261
18	Canóvanas	$11,094	$19,986
19	Cidra	$10,965	$20,389
20	Fajardo	$10,900	$18,941
21	Aguadilla	$10,872	$16,821
22	Río Grande	$10,804	$22,584
23	Ponce	$10,775	$16,561
24	Mayagüez	$10,656	$14,642
25	Aguas Buenas	$10,615	$16,733
26	Manatí	$10,559	$18,191
27	San Lorenzo	$10,497	$18,589
28	Vega Alta	$10,492	$18,053
29	Santa Isabel	$10,478	$16,816
30	Villalba	$10,449	$19,893
31	Luquillo	$10,434	$19,377
32	Hatillo	$10,360	$17,770
33	Las Piedras	$10,342	$20,587
34	Coamo	$10,307	$19,110
35	Juana Díaz	$10,244	$20,228
36	Aibonito	$10,224	$18,387
37	Rincón	$10,220	$18,292
38	Vega Baja	$10,197	$18,900
39	Naguabo	$10,016	$18,976
40	Arecibo	$9,954	$17,289
41	Camuy	$9,738	$17,579
42	San Germán	$9,563	$15,036
43	Cabo Rojo	$9,523	$16,461
44	Añasco	$9,344	$18,765
45	Quebradillas	$9,287	$16,082
46	Guayama	$9,183	$15,296
47	Sabana Grande	$9,158	$15,736
48	Juncos	$9,017	$18,533
49	Aguada	$9,001	$16,199
50	Naranjito	$8,996	$18,069
51	Maunabo	$8,830	$17,636
52	Morovis	$8,816	$18,739
53	Isabela	$8,798	$16,333
54	Barceloneta	$8,762	$17,113
55	Salinas	$8,738	$16,246
56	Loíza	$8,729	$17,273
57	Patillas	$8,679	$14,512
58	Yabucoa	$8,672	$15,586
59	Guayanilla	$8,347	$14,988
60	Lares	$8,212	$12,820
61	Utuado	$8,140	$15,931
62	Yauco	$8,124	$14,451
63	San Sebastián	$8,072	$14,275
64	Ciales	$8,049	$14,432
65	Peñuelas	$7,983	$16,868
66	Corozal	$7,887	$14,752
67	Moca	$7,881	$13,413
68	Florida	$7,837	$16,919
69	Barranquitas	$7,716	$15,694
70	Arroyo	$7,639	$15,689
71	Orocovis	$7,326	$14,296
72	Lajas	$7,229	$13,896
73	Guanica	$7,207	$12,653
74	Jayuya	$7,179	$15,615
75	Las Marías	$7,154	$14,404
76	Adjuntas	$7,117	$11,680
77	Comerío	$7,047	$13,523
78	Maricao	$5,943	$13,462

== See also ==
- List of lowest-income counties in the United States
