= List of barrios and sectors of Florida, Puerto Rico =

Like all municipalities of Puerto Rico, Florida is subdivided into administrative units called barrios, which are, in contemporary times, roughly comparable to minor civil divisions, (and means wards or boroughs or neighborhoods in English). The barrios and subbarrios, in turn, are further subdivided into smaller local populated place areas/units called sectores (sectors in English). The types of sectores may vary, from normally sector to urbanización to reparto to barriada to residencial, among others.

A newer municipality of Puerto Rico, Florida has one barrio called Florida Adentro and two subbarrios: Florida Zona Urbana and Pajonal, and it does not have a barrio-pueblo like most of the other municipalities of Puerto Rico.

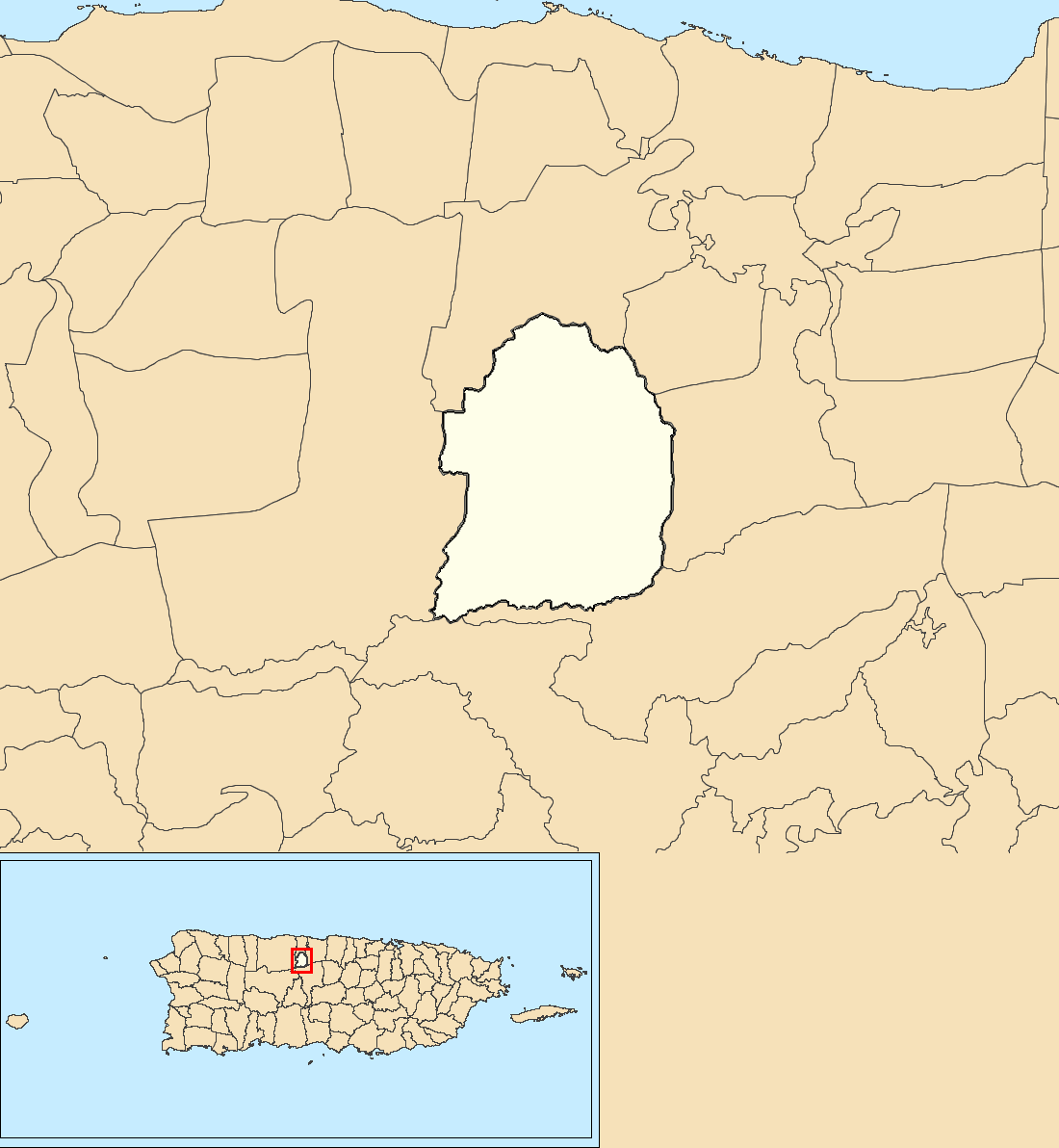
Florida map

The following areas are neighborhoods in Florida:

- Parcelas Arroyo
- Parcelas Selgas
- Perol
- Pueblo Viejo
- San Agustín
- Tosas

== List of sectors by barrio ==
=== Florida Adentro ===
- Alturas de Yanes 2da.
- Alturas de Yanes 3ra.
- Florida Gardens Apartments
- Avenida Heriberto González (Carretera 6642)
- Calle Antonio Alcázar
- Calle Charlie Montoyo
- Calle Delicias
- Calle Julio Reina (formerly Extensión Calle Jazmín)
- Calle Manuel Colón
- Calle Roberto González
- Calle Valle Verde
- Carretera 140
- Comunidad Alturas de Pajonal
- Comunidad Arroyo
- Comunidad La Fuente
- Edificio Mieses
- Égida de Florida
- Extensión Selgas (Los Quemaos)
- Parcelas Alturas de Yanes 1ra.
- Parcelas Selgas I
- Parcelas Selgas II
- Reparto Ceiba
- Reparto Diana
- Reparto Martínez
- Reparto Rita Mar
- Reparto San Agustín
- Residencial Villas de Florida
- Residencial Florida Housing
- Sector Aguacate
- Sector Ceiba
- Sector Comisión
- Sector Dorta
- Sector El Hoyo
- Sector Fogones
- Sector Juana Gómez
- Sector La Maldonado
- Sector La Vázquez
- Sector La Villamil
- Sector Los Guanos
- Sector Los Mangoses
- Sector Pajonal
- Sector Perol
- Sector Pueblo Viejo
- Sector Pueblo
- Sector Puerto Blanco
- Sector Riachuelo
- Sector San Agustín
- Sector San José
- Sector San Luis
- Sector Tosas
- Sector Valle Encantado
- Urbanización Altos de Florida
- Urbanización Altos de Florida II
- Urbanización Alturas de Florida
- Urbanización Colinas de Lourdes
- Urbanización Country Hills
- Urbanización Estancias de Arroyo
- Urbanización Estancias de Florida
- Urbanización Estancias de la Ceiba
- Urbanización Estancias de Lourdes
- Urbanización Haciendas Florida
- Urbanización Jardines de Florida
- Urbanización Las Flores
- Urbanización San José
- Urbanización Seoane
- Urbanización Vegas de Florida

== See also ==
- List of communities in Puerto Rico
