= List of city nicknames in Puerto Rico =

This partial list of city nicknames in Puerto Rico compiles the aliases, sobriquets and slogans that cities are known by (or have been known by historically), officially and unofficially, to municipal governments, local people, outsiders or their tourism boards or chambers of commerce. City nicknames can help in establishing a civic identity, helping outsiders recognize a community or attracting people to a community because of its nickname; promote civic pride; and build community unity. Nicknames and slogans that successfully create a new community "ideology or myth" are also believed to have economic value. Their economic value is difficult to measure, but there are anecdotal reports of cities that have achieved substantial economic benefits by "branding" themselves by adopting new slogans.

There are no less than 189 nicknames listed on the Puerto Rico municipalities directory. Some towns or cities or municipalities have a single nickname, some have as many as five.

Town, City, Municipality nicknames
Municipality	Nickname (In Spanish)	In English
Adjuntas	La ciudad del gigante dormido	City of the Sleeping Giant
Adjuntas	La Suiza de Puerto Rico	The Switzerland of Puerto Rico
Adjuntas	La tierra de lagos	The Land of Lakes
Aguada	Villa de San Francisco de Asís	Villa of Saint Francis of Asis
Aguada	La villa de Sotomayor	The Village of Sotomayor
Aguada	El pueblo playero	The Beach Village
Aguada	La ciudad del Vaticano	The Vatican City
Aguadilla	La leal villa del ojo de agua	
Aguadilla	El pueblo de los tiburones	The Village of the Sharks
Aguadilla	El nuevo jardín del Atlántico	The New Garden of the Atlantic
Aguadilla	Hasta donde las piedras cantan	Where Even the Stones Sing
Aguas Buenas	Ciudad de las aguas claras	The City of Clear Waters
Aguas Buenas	Los mulos	The Mules
Aguas Buenas	El oasis de Puerto Rico	The Oasis of Puerto Rico
Aguas Buenas	Los ñocos	
Aibonito	Ciudad de las flores	City of Flowers
Aibonito	Ciudad fría	Cold City
Aibonito	Jardín de Puerto Rico	Garden of Puerto Rico
Aibonito	La nevera de Puerto Rico	Puerto Rico's Refrigerator
Añasco	Donde los dioses murieron	Where the Gods Died
Añasco	El pueblo de los morcilleros	The Pueblo of the Blood Sausagers
Añasco	Los nativos	The Natives
Arecibo	Villa del Capitán Correa	The Villa of Captain Correa
Arecibo	Muy leal	Very Loyal
Arecibo	El pueblo del Cetí/ Ciudad del Cetí	Town / City of Cetí
Arecibo	Diamante del norte	Diamond of the North
Arecibo	Los capitanes	The Captains
Arroyo	El pueblo grato	The Pleasant Town
Arroyo	Los bucaneros	The Buccaneers
Barceloneta	Ciudad industrial	Industrial City
Barceloneta	La ciudad de las piñas	The City of Pineapples
Barceloneta	El pueblo de los indios	The Town of the Indians
Barceloneta	El pueblo de Sixto Escobar	Sixto Escobar's Town
Barranquitas	Cuna de próceres	Cradle of Heroes
Barranquitas	La cuna de Muñoz Rivera	The cradle of Muñoz Rivera
Barranquitas	El altar de la patria	The altar of the nation
Bayamón	El pueblo del chicharrón	The town of deep fried pork skin
Cabo Rojo	El pueblo de Cofresí	The town of Cofresí
Cabo Rojo	Los mata con hacha	The killers with machete
Cabo Rojo	Cuna de Betances	Cradle of Betances
Caguas	La ciudad del Turabo	The City of Turabo
Caguas	El corazón de Boriquén	The Heart of Boriquén
Caguas	La ciudad criolla	The Creole City
Camuy	Ciudad romántica	Romantic City
Camuy	Ciudad de los areneros	
Camuy	Ciudad del sol Taino	City of the Taino Sun
Canóvanas	Ciudad de los indios	City of the Indians
Canóvanas	Ciudad de las carreras	The City of the Races
Canóvanas	El pueblo del chupacabras	The Town of the Chupacabras
Carolina	Tierra de gigantes	Land of Giants
Carolina	Los tumba brazos	
Cataño	El pueblo que se negó a morir	The People Who Refused to Die
Cataño	La antesala de la Capital	The Antechamber of the Capital
Cataño	El pueblo olvidado	The Forgotten Town
Cataño	El pueblo de los jueyeros	
Cataño	El pueblo de los lancheros	
Cayey	Ciudad de las brumas	City of the Mists
Cayey	Ciudad del torito	The City of the Small Bull
Cayey	Ciudad del Coqui Dorado	Ciudad of the Golden Coqui
Ceiba	Los come sopa	The Soup Eaters
Ceiba	Ciudad del Marlin	The City of the Marlin
Ciales	Ciudad de la "cojoba"	
Ciales	La tierra del café	The Coffee Land
Ciales	Pueblo de los valerosos	The Pueblo of the Valuable Ones
Cidra	Pueblo de la eterna primavera	The Town of Eternal Spring
Cidra	Pueblo de la Paloma Sabanera	The Town of the Sabanera Dove
Coamo	Villa de San Blás de Illescas	The Villa de San Blas de Illescas
Coamo	Los maratonistas	The Marathoners
Coamo	La villa añeja	
Coamo	La ciudad de las aguas termales	The City of Thermal Waters
Comerío	La perla de plata	The Silver Pearl
Comerío	Pueblo de los guabaleros	
Corozal	La cuna del voleibol	The Cradle of Volleyball
Corozal	Los plataneros	The Plantainers
Culebra	Isla chiquita	Small Island
Culebra	La Isla municipio	The Island Municipality
Culebra	La última virgen	Last Virgin
Dorado	Ciudad dorada	Golden City
Dorado	La más limpia de Puerto Rico	The Cleanest in Puerto Rico
Fajardo	Los cariduros	The Hard Faces
Fajardo	La metrópolis del sol naciente	The Metropolis of the Rising Sun
Florida	Pueblo de la piña cayenalisa	Town of Cayenalisa Pineapple
Florida	Tierra del río encantado	The Land of the Enchanted River
Florida	Tierra de los mogotes	Land of the Mogotes
Guánica	Pueblo de la amistad	People of Friendship
Guánica	Pueblo de las doce calles	The Town of the Twelve Streets
Guánica	Puerta de la cultura	Gate of Culture
Guayama	Pueblo de los brujos	The Town of the Warlocks
Guayama	Ciudad bruja	Witch City
Guayama	Ciudad del Guamaní	
Guayanilla	Villa de los pescadores	Fishermen's Villa
Guayanilla	Los corre en yegua	
Guayanilla	Tierra de Agüeybaná	Land of Agüeybaná
Guaynabo	Primer poblado de Puerto Rico	First Village of Puerto Rico
Guaynabo	Ciudad de los conquistadores	The City of the Conquistadors
Guaynabo	El pueblo del Carnaval Mabó	The Village of the Mabó Carnival
Guaynabo	Los Mets	The Mets
Gurabo	Pueblo de las escaleras	The Town of the Stairs
Gurabo	Pueblo de las escalinatas	
Gurabo	Puerta del turismo del sureste	Southeast Tourism Gate
Hatillo	Costa azul de Puerto Rico	Puerto Rico's blue coast
Hatillo	Hatillo del corazón	Hatillo of the Heart
Hatillo	Tierra de campos verdes	Land of Green Fields
Hatillo	Capital de la industria lechera	Capital of the Dairy Industry
Hatillo	Ganaderos	Cattle Breeders
Hormigueros	Pueblo de la Virgen de la Monserrate	The Town of the Virgin of the Monserrate
Hormigueros	El pueblo del milagro	The Town of the Miracle
Hormigueros	Los peregrinos	The Pilgrims
Humacao	Perla del oriente	Pearl of the Orient
Humacao	Ciudad gris	Gray City
Humacao	Los "roye huesos"	
Isabela	Jardín del Noroeste	Garden of the Northwest
Isabela	Los gallitos	The Roosters
Isabela	Pueblo de los quesitos de hoja	
Jayuya	Ciudad de la tierra alta	City of High Land
Jayuya	Pueblo de los tres picachos	Town of the Three Peaks
Jayuya	Los tomateros	
Jayuya	Capital indígena de Puerto Rico	Puerto Rico's Indigenous Capital
Jayuya	El mirador de Puerto Rico	Puerto Rico's Lookout Point
Juana Díaz	La ciudad de los reyes	Three Kings City
Juana Díaz	Ciudad del mabí	City of Mauby
Juana Díaz	Ciudad del Jacaguas	
Juana Díaz	El Belén de Puerto Rico	The Bethlehem of Puerto Rico
Juncos	Ciudad del Valenciano	City of Valenciano
Juncos	Los mulos del Valenciano	
Lajas	Ciudad Cardenalicia	The Cardinal City
Lajas	Los tira piedras	The Stone Throwers
Lares	Ciudad del grito	City of the Scream
Lares	Los patriotas	The Patriots
Lares	Los leñeros	
Lares	Los que beben "leche di poti"	Those who drink bottled milk
Las Marías	Pueblo de la china dulce	Town of the Sweet Orange
Las Marías	Ciudad de los cítricos	City of Citrus
Las Piedras	Ciudad de los artesanos	City of the Craftsmen
Las Piedras	Los come "guábaras"	
Loíza	Capital de la tradición	Capital of the Tradition
Loíza	Los santeros	The Santeros
Loíza	Los cocoteros	
Luquillo	La Capital del sol	The Sun Capital
Luquillo	La Riviera de Puerto Rico	Puerto Rico's Riviera
Manatí	El Atenas de Puerto Rico	The Athens of Puerto Rico
Manatí	Ciudad metropolitana	Metropolitan City
Maricao	Pueblo de las Indieras	Town of the Indieras
Maricao	Tierra del café	Land of Coffee
Maricao	Ciudad del Monte del Estado	City of the State Mountain
Maricao	Ciudad de leyenda y romance	City of Legend and Romance
Maunabo	Ciudad tranquila	Calm City
Maunabo	Los jueyeros	Blue Land Crab fishermen
Maunabo	Los come jueyes	The Blue Land Crab Eaters
Mayagüez	Sultana del oeste	Sultan of the West
Mayagüez	Ciudad de las aguas puras	The City of Pure Waters
Mayagüez	El pueblo del mangó	Town of Mango
Moca	La capital del mundillo	The Lace Capital
Moca	Los vampiros	Vampires
Morovis	La isla menos Morovis	The Island Without Morovis
Naguabo	Pueblo de los enchumbaos	
Naguabo	Pueblo de los artistas	Town of Artists
Naguabo	Cuna de grandes artistas	Cradle of Great Artists
Naranjito	El pueblo de los changos	
Orocovis	Corazón de Puerto Rico	Heart of Puerto Rico
Orocovis	Centro geográfico de Puerto Rico	Geographic Center of Puerto Rico
Patillas	La esmeralda del sur	The Emerald of the South
Patillas	Los melones	The Mellons
Peñuelas	Valle de los flamboyanes	Valley of Flamboyan
Peñuelas	La capital del güiro	Capital of the Güiro
Ponce	Perla del Sur	Pearl of the South
Ponce	Ciudad Señorial	The Lordly City
Ponce	Ciudad de la quenepa	Genip City
Ponce	Los leones	The Lions
Quebradillas	La guarida del pirata	The Pirate's Lair
Quebradillas	La ciudad pirata	The Pirate City
Quebradillas	La ciudad del cooperativismo	The city of cooperation
Quebradillas	El rincón de guajataca	The Corner of Guajataca
Rincón	El Pueblo de los bellos atardeceres	The Village of the Beautiful Sunsets
Rincón	El pueblo del "surfing"	The Surfing Village
Rincón	Los "surfers"	The Surfers
Río Grande	Ciudad del Yunque	City of El Yunque
Sabana Grande	Ciudad del petate	
Sabana Grande	Pueblo de los petateros	
Sabana Grande	Pueblo de los prodigios	
Salinas	Pueblo del mojo isleño	
Salinas	Los marlins	The Marlins
San Germán	La ciudad de las lomas	The City of Hills
San Germán	Ciudad de las golondrinas	City of Swallows
San Germán	Ciudad fundadora de pueblos	
San Germán	Ciudad cuna del baloncesto Puertorriqueño	Cradle City of Puerto Rican Basketball
San Germán	Ciudad peregrina	Pilgrim City
San Juan	La ciudad amurallada	The Walled City
San Juan	Los capitalinos	
San Juan	Los senadores	The Senators
San Juan	La loza	
San Lorenzo	Pueblo de la samaritana	Town of the Samaritan Woman
San Lorenzo	Los samaritanos	The Samaritans
San Lorenzo	Ciudad samaritana	Samaritan City
San Sebastián	San Sebastián del Pepino	San Sebastián of Pepino
San Sebastián	El pepino	
San Sebastián	Cuna de la hamaca	Cradle of the Hammock
San Sebastián	Los patrulleros	The Patrollers
San Sebastián	San Sebastián de las vegas	
Santa Isabel	Tierra de campeones	Land of Champions
Santa Isabel	La ciudad de los potros	The City of the Colts
Santa Isabel	Los incompletos	The Incompletes
Toa Alta	Valle del toa	Valley of Toa
Toa Alta	Ciudad del josco	City of Josco
Toa Alta	Cuna de toa	City of Toa
Toa Alta	Cuna de poetas	Cradle of Poets
Toa Alta	Los babosos	
Toa Alta	Los ñangotaos	Those who squat
Toa Baja	Llaneros del toa	
Toa Baja	Los llaneros	
Toa Baja	Ciudad de los valles del toa	City of the Valleys of Toa
Toa Baja	Ciudad bajo aguas	City Under Waters
Trujillo Alto	Pueblo de los "arrecostaos"	Town of Those who Lean (on sth)
Trujillo Alto	Los "recostaos"	Those who lean (on sth)
Utuado	La ciudad del viví	City of Viví
Utuado	Los montañeses	
Vega Alta	Pueblo de los ñangotaos	
Vega Alta	Los maceteros	The flowerpots
Vega Baja	Pueblo del "Melao Melao"	"Melao Melao" Town
Vieques	La isla nena	Nena Island
Villalba	La ciudad del gandul	Pigeon Pea City
Villalba	Ciudad de los lagos avancinos	City of Lakes
Yabucoa	La ciudad del azúcar	Sugar City
Yabucoa	El pueblo de yuca	Yucca Town
Yabucoa	Los bebe leche	Those Who Drink Milk
Yauco	El pueblo del café	Coffee Town
Yauco	Pueblo de los corsos	The Corsicans

== See also ==
- List of city nicknames in the United States
- Municipalities of Puerto Rico
