= Florida Adentro, Florida, Puerto Rico =

Barrio of Puerto Rico

Florida Adentro
- Barrio
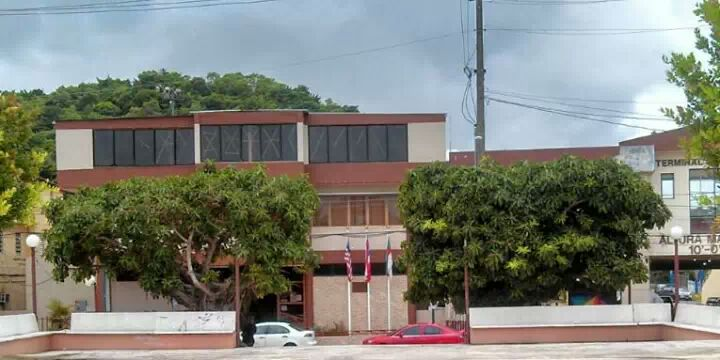
- Government building in Florida

- Location within Puerto Rico
- Coordinates: 18°22′26″N 66°33′36″W
- Commonwealth: Puerto Rico
- Municipality: Florida

Area
  - Total: 15.22 sq mi (39.4 km^{2})
  - Land: 15.21 sq mi (39.4 km^{2})
  - Water: 0.01 sq mi (0.026 km^{2})
- Elevation: 633 ft (193 m)

Population (2010)
  - Total: 12,680
  - Density: 833.7/sq mi (321.9/km^{2})
- Source: 2010 Census
- Time zone: UTC−4 (AST)
- ZIP Code: 00650
- Area code: 787/939

Florida Adentro is a barrio in the municipality of Florida, Puerto Rico. Its population in 2010 was 12,680.

== The central plaza and its church ==
Located across the central plaza in Florida Adentro is the Parroquia Nuestra Señora de la Merced, a Roman Catholic church.

== History ==
Florida Adentro was in Spain's gazetteers until Puerto Rico was ceded by Spain in the aftermath of the Spanish–American War under the terms of the Treaty of Paris of 1898 and became an unincorporated territory of the United States. In 1899, the United States Department of War conducted a census of Puerto Rico finding that the population of Florida Adentro barrio was 2,002. Florida Adentro was part of Barceloneta then.

Historical population
Census	Pop.	Note	%±
1900	2,002		—
1910	2,357		17.7%
1920	3,209		36.1%
1930	4,141		29.0%
1940	5,859		41.5%
1950	4,883		−16.7%
1960	4,841		−0.9%
1970	5,138		6.1%
1980	7,232		40.8%
1990	8,689		20.1%
2000	12,367		42.3%
2010	12,680		2.5%
U.S. Decennial Census; 1899 (shown as 1900) 1910-1930; 1930-1950 1980-2000 2010

== Sectors ==
Barrios (which are, in contemporary times, roughly comparable to minor civil divisions) are subdivided into smaller local populated place areas/units called sectores (sectors in English). The types of sectores may vary, from sector to urbanización to reparto to barriada to residencial, among others.

The following sectors are in Florida Adentro barrio:

Alturas de Yanes 2da., Alturas de Yanes 3ra., Florida Gardens Apartments, Avenida Heriberto González (Carretera 6642), Calle Antonio Alcázar, Calle Charlie Montoyo, Calle Delicias Norte, Calle Delicias Sur, Calle Julio Reina (formerly Extensión Calle Jazmín), Calle Manuel Colón, Calle Roberto González, Calle Valle Verde, Carretera 140, Comunidad Alturas de Pajonal, Comunidad Arroyo, Comunidad La Fuente, Edificio Mieses, Égida de Florida, Parcelas Alturas de Yanes 1ra, Parcelas Selgas I, Parcelas Selgas II y Extensión Selgas (Los Quemaos), Reparto Ceiba, Reparto Diana, Reparto Martínez, Reparto Rita Mar, Reparto San Agustín, Residencial Villas de Florida, Residencial Florida Housing, Sector Aguacate, Sector Ceiba, Sector Comisión, Sector Dorta, Sector El Hoyo, Sector Fogones, Sector Juana Gómez, Sector La Maldonado, Sector La Vázquez, Sector La Villamil, Sector Los Guanos, Sector Los Mangoses, Sector Pajonal, Sector Perol, Sector Pueblo Viejo, Sector Pueblo, Sector Puerto Blanco, Sector Riachuelo, Sector San Agustín, Sector San José, Sector San Luis, Sector Tosas, Sector Valle Encantado, Urbanización Altos de Florida, Urbanización Altos de Florida II, Urbanización Alturas de Florida, Urbanización Colinas de Lourdes, Urbanización Country Hills, Urbanización Estancias de Arroyo, Urbanización Estancias de Florida, Urbanización Estancias de la Ceiba, Urbanización Estancias de Lourdes, Urbanización Haciendas Florida, Urbanización Jardines de Florida, Urbanización Las Flores, Urbanización San José, Urbanización Seoane, and Urbanización Vegas de Florida.

== See also ==
- List of communities in Puerto Rico
- List of barrios and sectors of Florida, Puerto Rico
