= Border Rico =

Television series

Border Rico is a television show that is televised in the United States by The Travel Channel. With a total of six episodes, the reality show filmed in Puerto Rico, showed the US Customs and Border Control and the Puerto Rico Police at work, battling such crimes as smuggling, drug trafficking and others.
