= José Gerena Polanco =

Puerto Rican politician

Mayor of Florida
- Incumbent
- Assumed office January 14, 2013
- Preceded by: Aaron Pargas Ojeda

Personal details
- Party: New Progressive Party (PNP)
- Education: University of Puerto Rico (BA)

José Gerena Polanco is a Puerto Rican politician and the current mayor of Florida. Gerena is affiliated with the New Progressive Party (PNP) and has served as mayor since 2013. Has a BA in Human Resources from the University of Puerto Rico.
