= Puerto Rico Joint Forces of Rapid Action =

Agency within the Puerto Rico Police

Joint Forces of Rapid Action Fuerzas Unidas de Rápida Acción
- Abbreviation: FURA
- Motto: "Protección e integridad" "Integrity and protection"

Agency overview
- Formed: 1986

Jurisdictional structure
- Operations jurisdiction: Puerto Rico
- Area: 5,324 square miles (13,790 km^{2})
- Population: 3,994,259 (2007 estimate)
- Legal jurisdiction: Commonwealth of Puerto Rico
- General nature: Local civilian police

Operational structure
- Headquarters: Cuartel General 101 Roosevelt Ave, West Hato Rey San Juan, Puerto Rico
- Elected officer responsible: LtCol.José Rodriguez, Commanding officer
- Agency executive: Sr.Joseph González Falcón, Commissioner
- Parent agency: Puerto Rico Police Department
- Divisions: List: Maritime; Aerial Services; Canine Unit; Rescue; S.W.A.T.
- Regions: List: San Juan; Bayamon; Ponce; Carolina; Fajardo; Arecibo; Aguadilla; Caguas; Humacao; Mayagüez; Aibonito; Guayama; Utuado

Facilities
- Zones: Maritime (11)
- Police cars: />Ford Explorer (SUV); Dodge Durango; Dodge Charger
- Helicopters and airplanes: Bell 407>Bell 429 Cessna 206 Cessna Grand Caraban Beechcraft Baron 58
- Dogs: German Shepherd, Labrador Retriever, Golden Retriever

Website
- policia.pr.gov

The Puerto Rico Joint Forces of Rapid Action (FURA; Spanish: Fuerzas Unidas de Rapida Acción, lit. 'United Forces of Rapid Action') is an agency within the Puerto Rico Police in charge of specialized divisions that relate to federal law enforcement agencies of the United States, and coordinate operations between the PRPD and U.S. federal agencies. The force is a limited unit, well trained, and well recognized in the police. The force collaborates with law enforcement agencies of the federal government of the United States such as the Federal Bureau of Investigation, the Bureau of Alcohol, Tobacco, Firearms and Explosives, the United States Marshals Service, and the Department of Homeland Security among others.

== History ==
FURA's story dates back to the early establishment of the Spanish Civil Guard as this police system used as a main transport horses. After the Spanish–American War when Puerto Rico becomes a possession of the United States, the Insular Police of Puerto Rico was established February 1899, during the period for provision of the Military Governor Guy B. Henry. By this time the main ways of transportation on the island were horses. Therefore, these were used by police to move their staff to address the grievances of the people and force the security system in place then.

Over the years, the development progress of the island and the changes in the way of life, the new technology replaces the use of horses which had rendered a service of great benefit to the town. By the end of the 1950s at the behest of the governor of Puerto Rico, Luis Muñoz Marín, in response to booming tourist area of San Juan, became necessary to resort again to the implementation of the horses as an additional tool in preventing crime. This unit composed of one Sergeant, four officers and four horses purchased locally. In 1960 a sergeant and four PRPD officers were trained at the New York Police Mounted Academy.

In 1963, a new tool came to the PRPD, and that was the helicopter. The PRPD air unit was stationed at Isla Grande Airport, later to be known as Roig Police Air Base. Its fleet consisted of Fairchild Hiller FH-1100 and OH-23 Raven. On January 1, 1971, the order was drawn up which implements 71-1 Labor Standards and Procedures for the Mounted Unit. This indicated that it offers its services mainly in the coastal area in the prevention and enforcement of laws as established in Puerto Rico. If necessary and required the unit can expand its services to anywhere in the island. In 1979, the Puerto Rico Special Weapons and Tactics (S.W.A.T.) was formed within the Tactical Operations Division of the San Juan area, under the supervision of Sgt. Faustino Mendoza and Commander Jose E. Sánchez. The Puerto Rico Police decided to create this group after Israeli athletes were killed and taken hostage at the 1972 Summer Olympics in Munich, Germany, since Puerto Rico was close to holding the 1979 Pan American Games.

The division as well was created in 1986 under Executive Order 4645-B as the "United Forces of Rapid Action Corps. (FURA) against drug trafficking." It will integrate the units of Rescue, Mounted, Divers, SWAT, Aerial Services, Canine and Maritime.

On February 25, 1993, by Executive Order EO-1993-07, was converted into a regular program of programmatic and organizational structure of the Puerto Rico Police Department. Today, FURA works in conjunction with law enforcement agencies of the U.S. government, such as U.S. Immigration and Customs Enforcement, U.S. Customs and Border Protection, U.S. Coast Guard, among others.

During 2019, FURA agents confiscated 8659 kilos of cocaine, 65 lbs and 256 marijuana plants and 3 kilos of heroin.

== Units ==
FURA has six units that united forces with U.S. agencies to prevent the entry of drugs, weapons and illegal immigrants to Puerto Rico. It also provides support to units of the Puerto Rico Police Department and the police departments of 78 municipalities during interventions, riots, police raids or other situation that requires help from FURA. These units are:

=== Mounted Unit ===
This is the oldest unit from the Puerto Rico Police, formed in the time of the Spanish colonial rule in Puerto Rico, before the U.S. invasion of 1898. It became official as a unit in 1899 by Col. Frank Thacher. It was an essential unit during the first half of the 20th century. Then, governor Luis Muñoz Marín put the mounted unit to the tourist areas of Puerto Rico to call the attention of the tourist and provide better protection. Today, the PRPD Mounted unit is used in tourist areas of the San Juan Metropolitan Area like beaches and waterfronts. They are trained to use their horses to stop offenders, and they can use their horse as a method of intimidation in times of police intervention with offenders. There are 3 stations of the Mounted Unit, and if needed by police to patrol an area at festivals or family activities of large concentration of the audience, the unit moved its staff to that area needed for as long as necessary. The unit has its stations at:

- San Juan
- Piñones (Loiza)
- Boquerón (Cabo Rojo)
- Ensenada (Guánica)

=== Air Services ===
The Air Services of FURA was formed in 1963 as the Puerto Rico Police Air Unit at the Isla Grande Airport, later to be known by the police as Roig Police Air Base, in honor of whom formed the unit, Salvador T. Roig. Its fleet consisted of Fairchild Hiller FH-1100 and OH-23 Raven. The environment in the unit was light and quietly, unit the drug era of the late 1970s when Puerto Rico was becoming a bridge for drugs to the United States. In the early 1980s, the violence for drugs in Puerto Rico was rising in an alarming rate, and the helicopters was becoming a coastal patrol unit to catch in sight boats with thousand of pounds of drugs and illegal weapons. In the streets, the helicopters use at day was better that at night, because of the need of better equipment. In 1986, when FURA was formed, U.S. funds for law enforcement helped the unit to get better equipment, including state of the art helicopters. The fleet was changed to three MBB/Kawasaki BK 117, 3 MD Helicopters MD 500 and Bell 206 with tail numbers N117PD, N118PD and N119PD respectively. Those BK117 by that time were "state of the art" on equipment for the police patrolling missions. One has weather radar and full IFR capable. The Puerto Rico Police become one of the first air unit, through the United States to operate a large fleet of BK117 on the police mission. Today, those BK117 are not airworthy because of mechanical problems and most of them were auctioned.

In the mid 1990s, the air unit receive one MD 520N NOTAR system, tail number N128PD. Also, one Beechcraft Super King Air, from the program High Intensity Drug Trafficking Area. This aircraft have the same equipment as United States Customs Service aircraft. The primary mission is drug trafficking monitoring. In 1995 the Puerto Rico Air Unit received, five Bell OH-58 Kiowa from U.S. Army donation. The OH-58C are Demilitarized ("demilitarized" means converted to non-military use or purpose, returned to a civilian field). Today, this fleet of OH-58C is "Not Airworthy".

In 2000, the air unit received three brand new helicopters, Bell 407 tail number N137PD and N311DJ, one Bell 412 tail number N136PD. The Bell 412 was equipped "multi-mission" with rescue cable. In 2006, FURA received two new Bell 407 tail number N138PD and N139PD helicopters with new Wescam technology, including more powerful searchlights and heat-seeking monitors that it can use to search for a person under any obstacle. Also, it received a telephoto camera that can see a license plate very clearly from 4,000 feet (1,200 m) in the air. The system are capable of transmitting live image to ground units.

The air services is divided in two regions:

- Northern: Based at Roig Police Air Base in Isla Grande, patrols from the coast of Aguadilla to Yabucoa.
- Southern: Based at Mercedita Airport in Ponce, it patrols from Maunabo to Rincon.

Today, the airworthy fleet consists of one Cessna 310, two Cessna 404, four Bell 407s, one Bell 412, and three MD Helicopters MD 500 and one MD520N. The Beechcraft Super King Air and the OH-58 Kiowa were remove from the fleet because of maintenance cost. The air services is the main component of FURA, and collaborates in SWAT exercises and rescue mission, coastal patrol and air support for ground units.

=== Maritime Unit ===
The Maritime Unit of FURA is in charge of coastal and harbor patrol, illegal utilization of recreational boats, sea rescue and prevent the entrance of illegal drugs, weapons and immigrants to Puerto Rico. It was created as a single unit of the PRPD in the late 1930s, with headquarters in the San Juan harbor. Today, the Maritime Unit has 11 stations located in different places around Puerto Rico, creating a barrier for drugs, weapons and illegal immigrants, and better protection for citizens in coastal waters. They coordinate with air units of FURA, U.S. Coast Guard and CBP's Office of Air and Marine.

=== S.W.A.T. ===
Created in 1979 within the Tactical Operations Division of the San Juan area, the Special Weapons and Tactics Team of the PRPD retains its original responsibility to intervene in situations of hostage rescue, anti-sniper operations, search and arrest dangerous fugitives and to support other units of the PRPD. The unit works with U.S. federal agencies to fill raids and other high-risk situations. Also, the team is highly trained to conduct missions to protect dignitaries from other countries. After the terrorist attacks of September 11, 2001, nationwide SWAT teams are responsible for serving as primary units to intervene in places where the use or suspected use of weapons of mass destruction, where the assigned personnel are trained.

=== Divers ===
The Divers Unit of FURA performs search and rescue of missing persons in the water bodies of Puerto Rico. They also make inspections of ships and cruises as part of the Department of Homeland Security (DHS) in the San Juan Bay and on the entrance of the Ponce harbor. They perform special services for maritime surveillance, such as raids, coastal patrols and others.

=== Rescue ===
The Rescue Unit of FURA are responsible for the rescue efforts of search and rescue missions for missing persons, building collapses, landslides or other situations requiring their assistance. They also help fire rescue units and or emergency management units in traffic accidents or people who need to be displaced by floods. It provides support to PRPD units at the time of rupture or penetrate steel doors, gates, windows, etc. Also, with the help of the Air Services Unit and Maritime Unit, they serve as rescue swimmers in times of offshore rescue or flooded areas.
