= Aaron Pargas Ojeda =

Puerto Rican politician

Mayor of Florida
- In office January 14, 2005 – January 13, 2013
- Preceded by: Maria Dolores Guzmán Cardona
- Succeeded by: José Gerena Polanco

Personal details
- Party: New Progressive Party (PNP)

Aaron Pargas Ojeda is a Puerto Rican politician and former mayor of Florida. Pargas is affiliated with the New Progressive Party (PNP) and served as mayor from 2005 to 2013.
