= Florida, Puerto Rico =

Town and municipality of Puerto Rico

Florida Municipio de Florida
- Town and Municipality
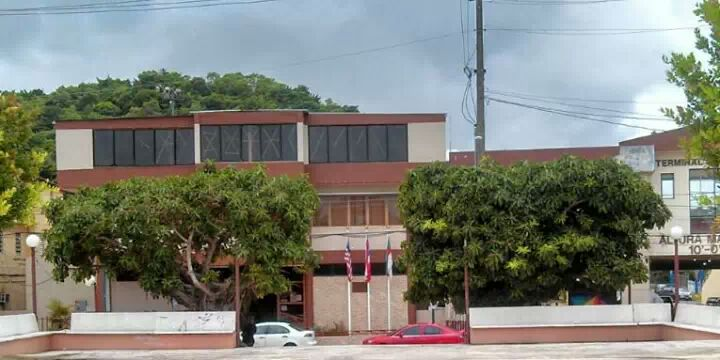
- Town Hall in Florida

- Flag Coat of arms
- Nicknames: "Pueblo de la Piña Cayenalisa", "La Tierra del Río Encantado", "Tierra de los Mogotes"
- Anthem: "Florida jardín hermoso (1961)"
- Map of Puerto Rico highlighting Florida Municipality
- Coordinates: 18°21′49″N 66°34′17″W
- Sovereign state: United States
- Commonwealth: Puerto Rico
- Settled: 1881
- Founded: July 10, 1974
- Founder: Leopoldo Malavé
- Barrios: 1 barrio: Florida Adentro

Government
  - Mayor: José Gerena Polanco (PNP)
  - Senatorial dist.: 3 – Arecibo
  - Representative dist.: 13

Area
  - Total: 10 sq mi (26 km^{2})

Population (2020)
  - Total: 11,692
  - Estimate (2025): 11,371 ▼
  - Rank: 72nd in Puerto Rico
  - Density: 1,200/sq mi (450/km^{2})
- Demonym: Florideños
- Time zone: UTC-4 (AST)
- ZIP Code: 00650
- Area code: 787/939

Florida (Spanish pronunciation: [floˈɾiða]) is a town and municipality of Puerto Rico located in the karst region north of Ciales, south of Barceloneta, east of Arecibo, and west of Manatí. Florida is not like other municipalities of Puerto Rico with multiple subdivisions called barrios. It has one barrio called Florida Adentro and two other subdivisions: Florida Zona Urbana and Pajonal comunidad. It is part of the San Juan-Caguas-Guaynabo Metropolitan Statistical Area.

== History ==
Florida was founded first as a barrio of Barceloneta in 1881 when a priest named Father Carrión, the mayor of Barceloneta, and other dignitaries visited a tract of land of almost 4 acres. They decided to establish a new barrio. The owner of the land, Don Manuel Cintrón, granted the land while he retained a piece of it. The barrio was first called Florida Adentro.

During the 20th century, several efforts were made to declare Florida as a municipality. First, on April 14, 1949, House Representative Francisco Díaz Marchand presented a project to create a legislative commission that would study the economic and social conditions of the barrio, to determine the suitability of it as an independent municipality. The project was unsuccessful. In 1960, Manuel Frías Morales presented a law that would permit the study to establish the municipality but it was also unsuccessful.

Finally, on June 14, 1971, the Senate of Puerto Rico and Governor Don Luis A. Ferré approved the law that officially created the municipality of Florida. It is thus the youngest municipality established in the island.

On September 20, 2017, Hurricane Maria struck Puerto Rico. In Florida, 1400 homes were a total loss and 2,295 homes were partially damaged.

== Geography ==
Florida is the second smallest municipality of Puerto Rico, with an area of 10 square miles. As the only municipality in Puerto Rico that has its urban area within the northern karst region (sometimes referred as the Northern Karst Hills), it is surrounded by low elevation, red clay and limestone haystack hills known in Caribbean Spanish as mogotes. The southern border of the municipality with Ciales remains one of the least developed areas on the island, due to the ruggedness of the karst. The Río Encantado, a subterranean river, drains this area. Several caves are found in the town, including Román Cave, Miró Cave, and Juana Gómez Cave. Balcon Cave (Cueva Balcón) is located in Florida.

=== Barrios ===
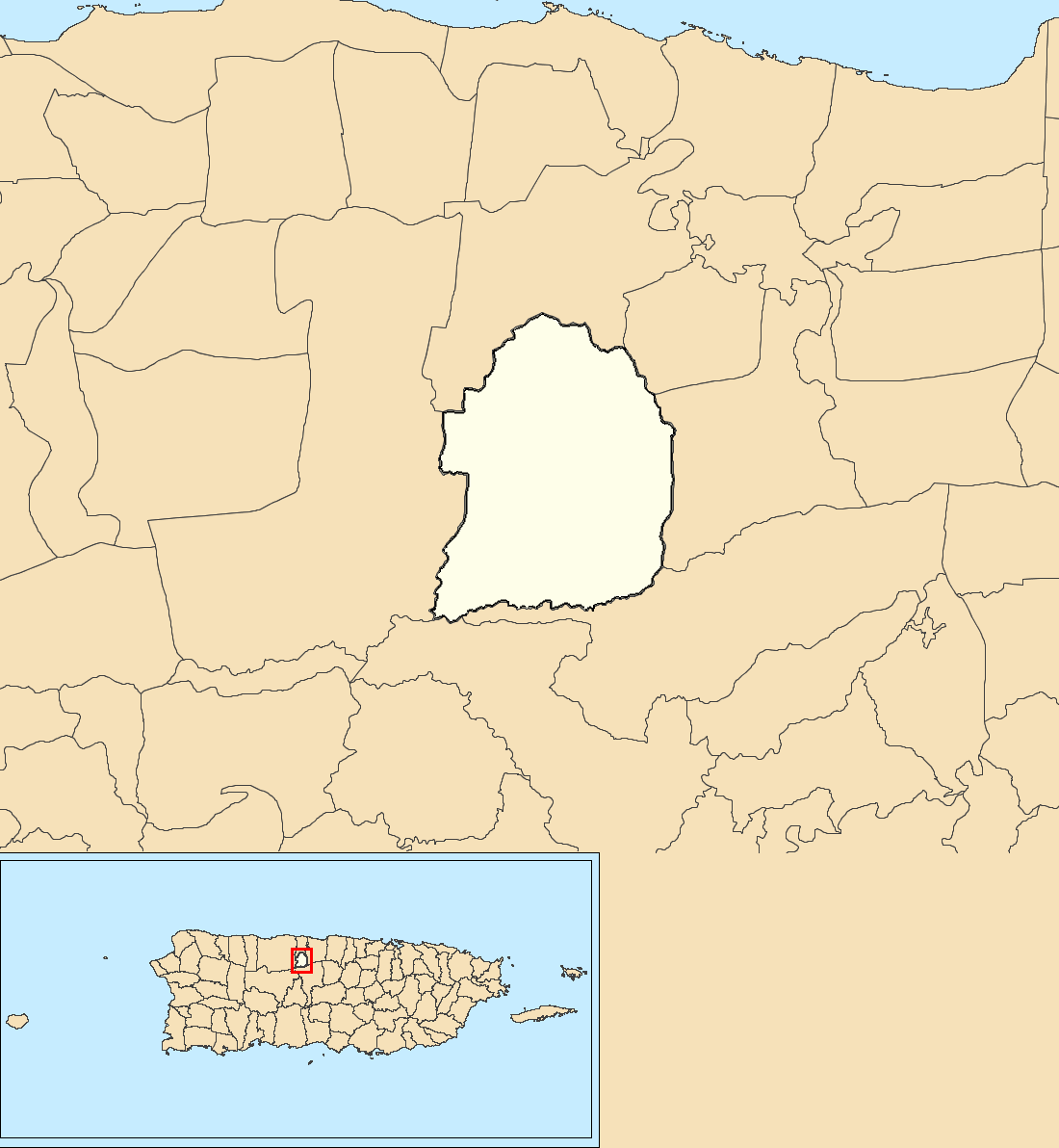
Florida.

As with all municipalities of Puerto Rico, Florida is subdivided into administrative units called barrios (which means barrios or boroughs or neighborhoods in English). A newer municipality of Puerto Rico, Florida has one barrio called Florida Adentro and two sub-barrios: Florida Zona Urbana and Pajonal. It does not have a "barrio-pueblo" like most of the other municipalities of Puerto Rico.

The following areas are neighborhoods in Florida:

- Parcelas Arroyo
- Parcelas Selgas
- Pueblo Viejo
- San Agustín
- Perol
- Tosas
- La Villamil
- Dolta

=== Sectors ===
Barrios (which are, in contemporary times, roughly comparable to minor civil divisions) are further subdivided into smaller areas called sectores (sectors in English). The types of sectores may vary, from sector to urbanización to reparto to barriada to residencial, among others.

=== Special Communities ===
Comunidades Especiales de Puerto Rico (Special Communities of Puerto Rico) are marginalized communities whose citizens are experiencing a certain amount of social exclusion. A map shows these communities occur in nearly every municipality of the commonwealth. Of the 742 places that were on the list in 2014, the following barrios, communities, sectors, or neighborhoods were in Florida: Sector El Hoyo in Comunidad San Agustín, Comunidad Arroyo, Sector Polvorín in Comunidad La Ceiba, Comunidad La Fuente, Estancias de Arroyo in La Joya, Sector El Cerro in Pajonal, and Sectors La Charca and Los Quemaos (both) in Parcelas Selgas.

== Culture and tourism ==
To stimulate local tourism, the Puerto Rico Tourism Company launched the Voy Turistiendo ("I'm Touring") campaign, with a passport book and website. The Florida page lists Parque Ecológico Janet González, Río Encantado, and Bandera de Puerto Rico of the project Una Bandera, 78 Pueblos (One Flag, 78 Pueblos), as places of interest.

=== Festival and events ===
Florida celebrates its patron saint festival in September. The Fiestas Patronales de Nuestra Señora de las Mercedes is a religious and cultural celebration that generally features parades, games, artisans, amusement rides, regional food, and live entertainment.

Other festivals and events celebrated in Florida include:

- Three Kings Festival – January
- Cayenalisa Pineapple Festival – July
- Cultural Fair of Río Encantado – October

== Economy ==
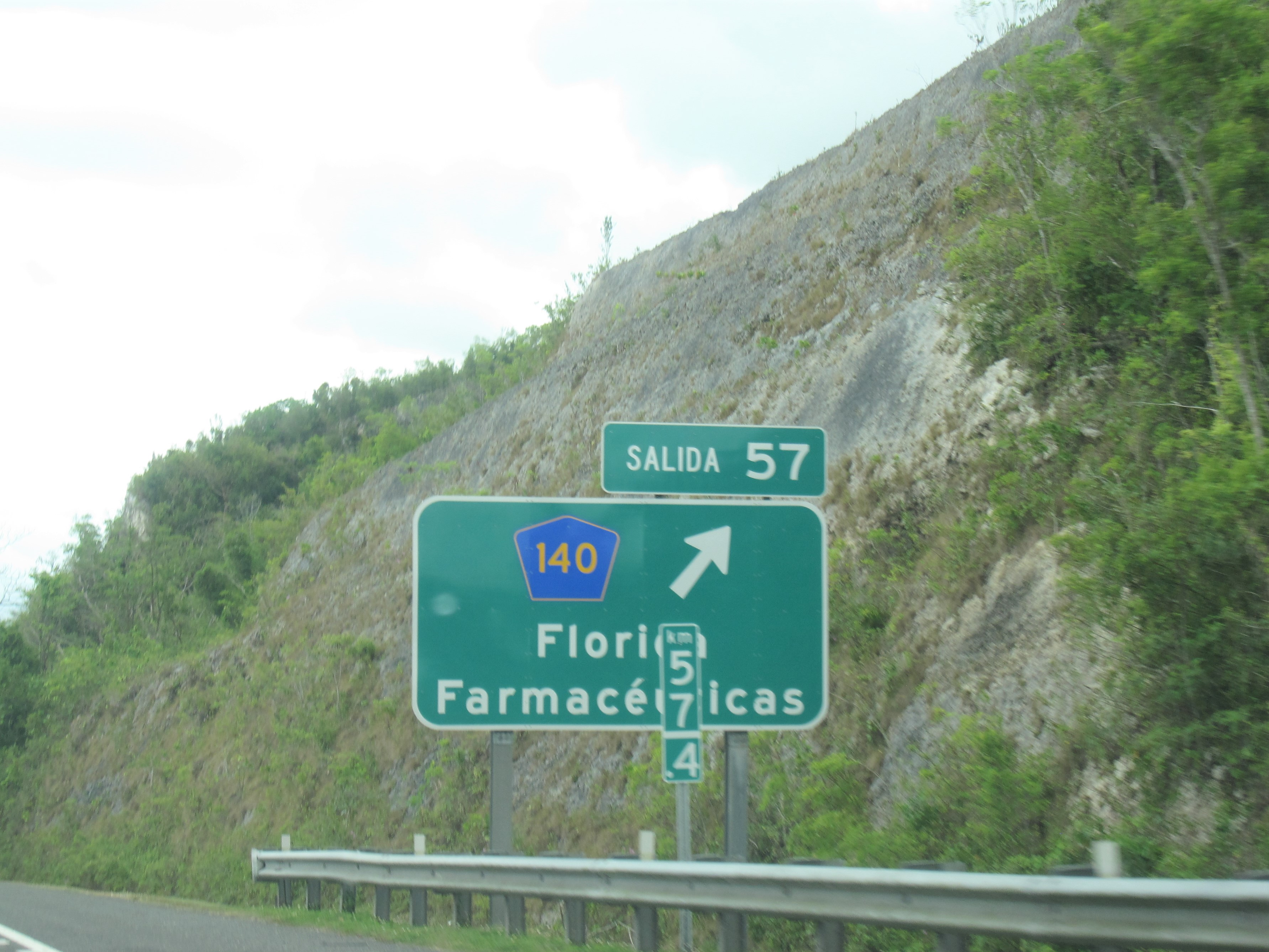
Sign for Florida Pharmaceuticals and PR-140, Exit 57 from PR-2

Historically, Florida's economy relied heavily on agriculture, specifically pineapple crops and other fruit-related products. In recent decades, along with the rest of the Island, rapid urbanization and industrialization, along with economic challenges, have forced Florida's fruit industry to near extinction. Pharmaceutical manufacturing plants have been established in Florida.

== Demographics ==
Historical population
Census	Pop.	Note	%±
1980	7,232		—
1990	8,689		20.1%
2000	12,367		42.3%
2010	12,680		2.5%
2020	11,692		−7.8%
2025 (est.)	11,371	▼	−2.7%
U.S. Decennial Census; 1899 (shown as 1900) 1910–1930; 1930–1950 1960–2000 2010 2020

Florida is one of the least populated municipalities of Puerto Rico, perhaps due to its small size. The population, according to the 2000 census, was 12,237 with a population density of 1,236.7 people per square mile (475.6/km^{2}). After its establishment in 1974, the population has steadily increased over the years, with 7,232 people in the 1980 census.

Statistics taken from the 2000 census shows that 86.0% of Florideños are of White origin, 4.9% are black, 0.2% are Amerindian etc.

Race – Florida, Puerto Rico – 2000 Census
Race	Population	% of Total
White	11,381	92.0%
Black/African American	305	2.5%
American Indian and Alaska Native	43	0.3%
Asian	31	0.3%
Native Hawaiian/Pacific Islander	0	0.0%
Some other race	409	3.3%
Two or more races	198	1.6%

== Government ==
After its initial establishment, Florida belonged to the Barceloneta region. In 1949 and 1960 there were some attempts to separate the barrio from Barceloneta, but these were unsuccessful. However, in 1974, Governor Luis A. Ferré and the Puerto Rican Senate officially declared Florida an independent municipality. Its first mayor was Jorge L. Pérez Piñeiro. The current mayor is José Gerena Polanco, of the New Progressive Party (PNP). He was elected in the 2012 general elections.

The city belongs to the Puerto Rico Senatorial district III, which is represented by two senators. In 2024, Brenda Pérez Soto and Gabriel González were elected as District Senators.

== Symbols ==
The municipio has an official flag and coat of arms.

=== Flag ===
It consists of three horizontal stripes, with the following colors and widths: green the superior and white the inferior, with five modules of width each one, the center one red, with a width of one module.

=== Coat of arms ===
Field of silver, in an abyss, a gules (red) anchored cross, like the one in the Asturian district of Llanes. The cross is anchored between two branches of bloomed poinsettias (Poinsettia pulcherrima). A green terrace represents the hilly terrain of the town, with a stripe forming waves outlined in silver which represents the underground river of Encantado. At the top, a three tower gold crown distinct in municipalities coat of arms. The shield can be surrounded, to its flanks and bottom by two crossed coffee tree branches with fruits.

=== Names ===
Florida derives its name from the abundant flowers and natural resources on its land. It is also known as La Tierra del Río Encantado due to an underground river called Encantado. Another nickname is the Pueblo de la Piña Cayenalisa due to its pineapple crops.

== Education ==
There are several public and private schools, serving students in pre-kindergarten through twelfth grade, distributed throughout the municipality of Florida. Public education is handled by the Puerto Rico Department of Education. These are some of the schools in Florida, as of 2020:

- Adolfo Egüen School
- Juanita Ramírez González School
- Juan Ponce De León II School
- Francisco Frías Morales School
- Ricardo Rodríguez Torres School
- Early Head Start

== Transportation ==
Puerto Rico Highway 22 provides access to PR-140, which leads to Florida from the cities of Mayagüez in the west, or San Juan in the north.

Like most other towns on the Island, it has a public transportation system consisting of small, subsidized private buses and vans called públicos.

There is only one bridge in Florida.

== Mayors of Florida ==
- 1974–1981 – Jorge Luis Pérez Piñeiro
- 1981–1984 – Heriberto González Vélez
- 1984–1992 – Juan Ramon De León Vélez [Johnny]
- 1992–2004 – Maria Dolores Guzmán Cardona [Maggie]
- 2004–2012 – José Aaron Pargas Ojeda
- 2012–present – José Gerena Polanco

== Notable Florideños ==
- Alexis Mateo – Drag queen and contestant on Season 3 of RuPaul's Drag Race
- Charlie Montoyo – Former Manager of the Toronto Blue Jays and former Major League Baseball player
- Abimelec Ortiz – Major League Baseball player for the Washington Nationals, attended Carlos Beltran Baseball Academy

== See also ==
- List of Puerto Ricans
- History of Puerto Rico
