= 2016 Puerto Rican municipal elections =

- November 8, 2016

All 78 municipalities
	Majority party	Minority party
Leader	Rolando Ortiz Velázquez	Héctor O’Neill Garcia
Party	Popular Democratic	New Progressive
Alliance	Puerto Rico Mayors Association	Puerto Rico Mayors Federation
Leader since	February 3, 2015	January 9, 2009
Leader's seat	Cayey	Guaynabo
Seats before	47	31
Seats after	45	33
Seat change	▼2	▲2
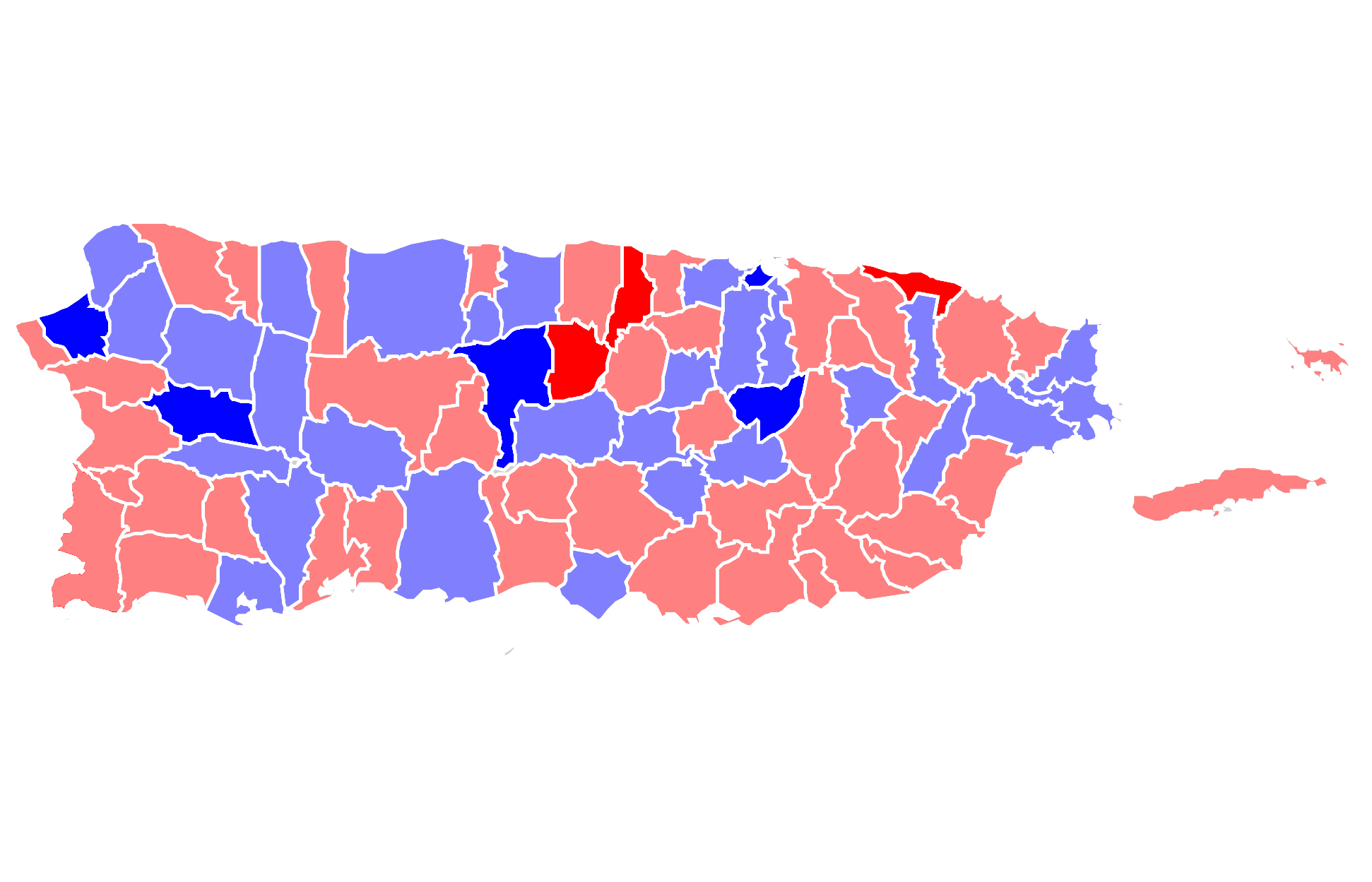
- Election results: PNP gain PPD gain PNP hold PPD hold

The 2016 Puerto Rican municipal election was held on November 8, 2016, to elect the mayors of the 78 municipalities of Puerto Rico, concurrently with the election of the Governor, the Resident Commissioner, the Senate, and the House of Representatives. The winners were elected to a four-year term from January 3, 2017, to January 3, 2021.

The Popular Democratic Party kept most of the municipalities, only going from 47 to 45. 8 municipalities flipped parties, these being Aguada, Aguas Buenas, Cataño, Ciales, Las Marías, Loiza, Morovis, Vega Alta. The most shocking flip was Loiza, which had been under New Progressive Party control since 1973.

== Results ==
=== Adjuntas ===
2016 Adjuntas mayoral election
Candidate	Party	Votes	%	+/–
Jaime Barlucea (incumbent)	New Progressive Party	6,243	60.16	+6.74
Víctor Vitito Pérez	Popular Democratic Party	3,878	37.37	–7.24
Adalberto Lugo Boneta	Puerto Rican Independence Party	256	2.47	+1.51
Total		10,377	100.00	–
New Progressive Party hold				

Incumbent mayor Jaime Barlucea Maldonado won his fourth term due to an internal split within the Popular Democratic Party.

=== Aguada ===
2016 Aguada mayoral election
Candidate	Party	Votes	%	+/–
Manuel Santiago Mendoza	New Progressive Party	10,326	49.89	+5.31
Jessie Cortés Ramos	Popular Democratic Party	9,929	47.97	–4.73
Roberto Cotto	Puerto Rican Independence Party	443	2.14	+1.01
Total		20,698	100.00	–
New Progressive Party gain from Popular Democratic Party				

Manuel Santiago Mendoza won the PNP primary and won against incumbent mayor Jessie Cortés Ramos.

=== Aguadilla ===
2016 Aguadilla mayoral election
Candidate	Party	Votes	%	+/–
Carlos Méndez (incumbent)	New Progressive Party	15,119	65.63	+14.06
Noemí Cardona Tomassini	Popular Democratic Party	7,269	31.55	–13.54
Rafael Boglio Martínez	Puerto Rican Independence Party	418	1.81	+0.30
Ivette Mejias	Independent	231	1.00	New
Total		23,037	100.00	–
New Progressive Party hold				

Incumbent mayor Carlos Méndez Martínez won the PNP primary and his sixth term.

=== Aguas Buenas ===
2016 Aguas Buenas mayoral election
Candidate	Party	Votes	%	+/–
Javier García Pérez	New Progressive Party	8,005	62.20	+13.99
Nilsa García Cabrera	Popular Democratic Party	3,749	29.13	–19.52
Luis Díaz	Puerto Rican Independence Party	1,116	8.67	+6.19
Total		12,870	100.00	–
New Progressive Party gain from Popular Democratic Party				

Previous PPD mayor Luis Arroyo Chiqués announced on May 18, 2015, that he would not seek re-election for a 4th term. PNP candidate Javier García Pérez won the election, ending 12 years of PPD control of the municipality.

=== Aibonito ===
2016 Aibonito mayoral election
Candidate	Party	Votes	%	+/–
William Alicea Pérez (incumbent)	New Progressive Party	9,062	71.26	+10.73
Izael Santiago Rivera	Popular Democratic Party	3,334	26.22	–10.97
Graciela Rosario	Puerto Rican Independence Party	320	2.52	+0.90
Total		12,716	100.00	–
New Progressive Party hold				

Incumbent mayor William Alicea Pérez won his third term.

=== Añasco ===
2016 Añasco mayoral election
Candidate	Party	Votes	%	+/–
Jorge Estévez (incumbent)	Popular Democratic Party	7,614	53.85	–0.78
Pablo Crespo Torres	New Progressive Party	6,301	44.56	+0.59
Antonio Vargas Morales	Puerto Rican Independence Party	224	1.58	+0.96
Total		14,139	100.00	–
Popular Democratic Party hold				

Pablo Crespo Torres won the PNP primary. Nonetheless, incumbent mayor Jorge Estévez Martínez won his third term.

=== Arecibo ===
2016 Arecibo mayoral election
Candidate	Party	Votes	%	+/–
Carlos Molina (incumbent)	New Progressive Party	28,089	72.12	+13.64
Lourdes Acevedo Concepción	Popular Democratic Party	9,788	25.13	–13.94
Javier Biaggi Caballero	Puerto Rican Independence Party	1,071	2.75	+1.32
Total		38,948	100.00	–
New Progressive Party hold				

Incumbent mayor Carlos Molina Rodríguez won the PNP primary and his second term.

=== Arroyo ===
2016 Arroyo mayoral election
Candidate	Party	Votes	%	+/–
Eric Bachier Román (incumbent)	Popular Democratic Party	4,950	54.48	+1.62
Edwin Santell Cora	New Progressive Party	3,968	43.67	–0.45
Anselmo Mariani	Puerto Rican Independence Party	168	1.85	–0.05
Total		9,086	100.00	–
Popular Democratic Party hold				

Edwin Santell Cora won the PNP primary. Nonetheless, incumbent mayor Eric Bachier Román won his second term.

=== Barceloneta ===
2016 Barceloneta mayoral election
Candidate	Party	Votes	%	+/–
Wanda Soler Rosario (incumbent)	Popular Democratic Party	6,790	56.65	–12.57
Balseiro Ángel	New Progressive Party	5,065	42.26	+15.17
Coralys Marrero Córdova	Puerto Rican Independence Party	130	1.08	+0.32
Total		11,985	100.00	–
Popular Democratic Party hold				

Incumbent mayor Wanda Soler Rosario won her second term.

=== Barranquitas ===
2016 Barranquitas mayoral election
Candidate	Party	Votes	%	+/–
Francisco López (incumbent)	New Progressive Party	8,869	61.51	+3.84
Ardyce Rivera Guzmán	Popular Democratic Party	5,173	35.88	–3.99
Elsa Berríos López	Puerto Rican Independence Party	376	2.61	+1.14
Total		14,418	100.00	–
New Progressive Party hold				

Incumbent mayor Francisco López López won his sixth term.

=== Bayamón ===
2016 Bayamón mayoral election
Candidate	Party	Votes	%	+/–
Ramón Rivera Cruz (incumbent)	New Progressive Party	60,115	73.36	+10.82
Jaime Otero Semprit	Popular Democratic Party	19,415	23.69	–10.50
Félix Rodríguez	Puerto Rican Independence Party	2,416	2.95	+1.17
Total		81,946	100.00	–
New Progressive Party hold				

Incumbent mayor Ramón Rivera Cruz won his fifth term.

=== Cabo Rojo ===
2016 Cabo Rojo mayoral election
Candidate	Party	Votes	%	+/–
Roberto Ramírez Kurtz (incumbent)	Popular Democratic Party	11,127	53.13	+7.73
Jorge Morales Wiscovitch	New Progressive Party	9,022	43.08	+1.84
Anagaly Bracero Pérez	Puerto Rican Independence Party	793	3.79	+1.18
Total		20,942	100.00	–
Popular Democratic Party hold				

Jorge Morales Wiscovitch won the PNP primary. Nonetheless, incumbent mayor Roberto Ramírez Kurtz won his second term.

=== Caguas ===
2016 Caguas mayoral election
Candidate	Party	Votes	%	+/–
William Miranda Torres (incumbent)	Popular Democratic Party	39,483	68.19	+5.31
Roberto López	New Progressive Party	17,047	29.44	–5.39
Luis Domenech Sepúlveda	Puerto Rican Independence Party	1,370	2.37	+0.96
Total		57,900	100.00	–
Popular Democratic Party hold				

Roberto López won the PNP primary. Nonetheless, incumbent mayor William Miranda Torres won his second term.

=== Camuy ===
2016 Camuy mayoral election
Candidate	Party	Votes	%	+/–
Edwin García Feliciano (incumbent)	New Progressive Party	9,299	55.41	+1.24
Iván Serrano Cordero	Popular Democratic Party	7,108	42.35	–1.31
Fernando Babilonia Aguilar	Puerto Rican Independence Party	376	2.24	+0.99
Total		16,783	100.00	–
New Progressive Party hold				

Iván Serrano Cordero won the PPD primary. Nonetheless, incumbent mayor Edwin García Feliciano won his fourth term.

=== Canóvanas ===
2016 Canóvanas mayoral election
Candidate	Party	Votes	%	+/–
Lorna Soto Villanueva (incumbent)	New Progressive Party	9,224	51.78	–3.36
Enrique Calderón Robles	Popular Democratic Party	8,188	45.96	+5.18
Reginald Carrasquillo Maisonet	Puerto Rican Independence Party	402	2.26	+0.37
Total		17,814	100.00	–
New Progressive Party hold				

Previous PNP mayor José Soto Rivera announced on May 14, 2014, that he would renounce to his post on June 30, 2014, and that his daughter, Lorna Soto Villanueva would take over as mayor. On July 1, Soto Villanueva was sworn in as the mayor to finish her father's term. She went on to win the PNP primary and was elected to serve a first full term in office.

=== Carolina ===
2016 Carolina mayoral election
Candidate	Party	Votes	%	+/–
José Aponte Dalmau (incumbent)	Popular Democratic Party	49,232	72.36	+3.34
Eduardo González Antelo	New Progressive Party	17,534	25.77	–3.54
Myrta Cintrón Piñero	Puerto Rican Independence Party	1,268	1.86	+0.78
Total		68,034	100.00	–
Popular Democratic Party hold				

Eduardo González Antelo won the PNP primary. Nonetheless, incumbent mayor José Aponte Dalmau won his third term.

=== Cataño ===
2016 Cataño mayoral election
Candidate	Party	Votes	%	+/–
Félix Delgado Montalva	New Progressive Party	8,265	64.68	+15.73
José Rosario Meléndez (Incumbent)	Popular Democratic Party	4,264	33.37	–16.18
Yolanda Ortiz Del Rosario	Puerto Rican Independence Party	249	1.95	+1.08
Total		12,778	100.00	–
New Progressive Party gain from Popular Democratic Party				

On May 16, 2016, the PPD cancelled its primary after learning that candidate Leslie Eaton Ramos had failed to reveal a previous police booking for an alleged criminal event. Eaton Ramos took the party to court, and the court decided that the primary had to be held. The incumbent mayor José Rosario Meléndez won the primary with a total of 4 votes. The PPD appealed, and the Court of Appeals declared Eaton Ramos officially disqualified, and that incumbent mayor José Rosario Meléndez had to be declared the winner. The Supreme Court of Puerto Rico decided not to revise the Court of Appeals' decision. Rosario Meléndez ultimately lost to PNP candidate Félix Delgado Montalvo.

=== Cayey ===
2016 Cayey mayoral election
Candidate	Party	Votes	%	+/–
Rolando Ortiz (incumbent)	Popular Democratic Party	15,043	74.06	+0.77
Von Rivera Rivera	New Progressive Party	4,640	22.84	–0.42
Migdonio Hernández	Puerto Rican Independence Party	630	3.10	+0.64
Total		20,313	100.00	–
Popular Democratic Party hold				

Von Rivera Rivera won the PNP primary. Nonetheless, incumbent mayor Rolando Ortiz Velázquez won his sixth term.

=== Ceiba ===
2016 Ceiba mayoral election
Candidate	Party	Votes	%	+/–
Angelo Cruz Ramos (incumbent)	New Progressive Party	3,380	62.22	+20.70
Melinda Ramos	Popular Democratic Party	1,973	36.32	+1.02
Carlos Pino Pagán	Puerto Rican Independence Party	79	1.45	–
Total		5,432	100.00	–
New Progressive Party hold				

Melinda Ramos won the PPD primary. Nonetheless, incumbent mayor Angelo Cruz Ramos won the PNP primary and his second term.

=== Ciales ===
2016 Ciales mayoral election
Candidate	Party	Votes	%	+/–
Luis Maldonado Rodríguez	New Progressive Party	5,566	50.42	+1.42
Juan Rodríguez Pérez (incumbent)	Popular Democratic Party	5,372	48.66	–0.88
Francisco Vicéns	Puerto Rican Independence Party	101	0.91	+0.21
Total		11,039	100.00	–
New Progressive Party gain from Popular Democratic Party				

Incumbent mayor Juan Rodríguez Pérez ran for a second term, but lost to PNP candidate Luis Maldonado Rodríguez, who won his third non-consecutive term.

=== Cidra ===
2016 Cidra mayoral election
Candidate	Party	Votes	%	+/–
Javier Carrasquillo (incumbent)	New Progressive Party	12,139	63.31	+12.92
Rudy Santos García	Popular Democratic Party	6,319	32.96	–9.91
Alberto Santiago Rivera	Puerto Rican Independence Party	716	3.73	+0.96
Total		19,174	100.00	–
New Progressive Party hold				

Incumbent mayor Javier Carrasquillo Cruz won his second term.

=== Coamo ===
2016 Coamo mayoral election
Candidate	Party	Votes	%	+/–
Juan García Padilla (incumbent)	Popular Democratic Party	9,862	58.06	–0.19
Manuel Claudio Rodríguez	New Progressive Party	6,860	40.39	+0.16
Rolando Cartagena Ramos	Puerto Rican Independence Party	263	1.55	+0.87
Total		16,985	100.00	–
Popular Democratic Party hold				

Incumbent mayor Juan García Padilla won his fifth term.

=== Comerío ===
2016 Comerío mayoral election
Candidate	Party	Votes	%	+/–
José Santiago Rivera (incumbent)	Popular Democratic Party	5,779	56.82	–0.24
Ricardo Rodríguez	New Progressive Party	4,267	41.96	+1.03
Roy Ayala Pérez	Puerto Rican Independence Party	124	1.22	+0.43
Total		10,170	100.00	–
Popular Democratic Party hold				

Incumbent mayor José Santiago Rivera won his fifith term.

=== Corozal ===
2016 Corozal mayoral election
Candidate	Party	Votes	%	+/–
Sergio Torres Torres (incumbent)	Popular Democratic Party	10,018	54.44	+0.76
Manolo Landrón Ángel	New Progressive Party	8,152	44.30	–0.53
Andrés Miranda Rosado	Puerto Rican Independence Party	232	1.26	+0.36
Total		18,402	100.00	–
Popular Democratic Party hold				

Incumbent mayor Sergio Torres Torres won his second term.

=== Culebra ===
2016 Culebra mayoral election
Candidate	Party	Votes	%	+/–
Iván Solís Bermúdez (incumbent)	Popular Democratic Party	714	57.40	+5.84
Basilio Graciani Pereira	New Progressive Party	522	41.96	–5.2
JÁngel Luis Sanes	Puerto Rican Independence Party	8	0.64	+0.10
Total		1,244	100.00	–
Popular Democratic Party hold				

Basilio Graciani Pereira won the PNP primary. Nonetheless, incumbent mayor Iván Solís Bermúdez won the PPD primary and his second term.

=== Dorado ===
2016 Dorado mayoral election
Candidate	Party	Votes	%	+/–
Carlos López Rivera (incumbent)	Popular Democratic Party	9,053	51.42	–7.28
Waldemar Volmar Méndez	New Progressive Party	8,228	46.73	+7.78
Josué Rafael Correa	Puerto Rican Independence Party	326	1.85	+0.01
Total		17,607	100.00	–
Popular Democratic Party hold				

Waldemar Volmar Méndez won the PNP primary. Nonetheless, incumbent mayor Carlos López Rivera won his eighth term.

=== Fajardo ===
2016 Fajardo mayoral election
Candidate	Party	Votes	%	+/–
Aníbal Meléndez (incumbent)	New Progressive Party	8,627	69.35	+4.82
Jaime Laureano	Popular Democratic Party	3,403	27.36	–4.72
Rosa Rodríguez Peñalbert	Puerto Rican Independence Party	240	1.93	–0.14
Michael Avilés	Independent	169	1.36	New
Total		12,439	100.00	–
New Progressive Party hold				

Incumbent mayor Aníbal Meléndez Rivera won his eight term.

=== Florida ===
2016 Florida mayoral election
Candidate	Party	Votes	%	+/–
José Gerena Polanco (incumbent)	New Progressive Party	3,418	52.75	–13.38
Carlos Tato Ruiz	Popular Democratic Party	2,942	45.40	+13.55
Beverly Rivera Echevarría	Puerto Rican Independence Party	120	1.85	+0.83
Total		6,480	100.00	–
New Progressive Party hold				

Incumbent mayor José Gerena Polanco won the PNP primary and his second term.

=== Guánica ===
2016 Guánica mayoral election
Candidate	Party	Votes	%	+/–
Santos Seda Nazario (Incumbent)	New Progressive Party	5,501	58.67	+6.27
Martín Vargas Morales	Popular Democratic Party	3,695	39.41	–6.96
Tasha Rodríguez Feliciano	Puerto Rican Independence Party	180	1.92	+1.28
Total		9,376	100.00	–
New Progressive Party hold				

Incumbent mayor Santos Seda Nazario won his second term.

=== Guayama ===
2016 Guayama mayoral election
Candidate	Party	Votes	%	+/–
Eduardo Cintrón (incumbent)	Popular Democratic Party	9,497	52.48	+2.54
Glorimari Jaime	New Progressive Party	8,233	45.50	–2.03
José De Jesús Peña	Puerto Rican Independence Party	366	2.02	+0.53
Total		18,096	100.00	–
Popular Democratic Party hold				

Incumbent mayor Eduardo Cintrón Suárez won the PPD primary and his second term.

=== Guayanilla ===
2016 Guayanilla mayoral election
Candidate	Party	Votes	%	+/–
Nelson Torres Yordán (incumbent)	Popular Democratic Party	5,545	52.41	+1.95
Héctor Rodríguez Rodríguez	New Progressive Party	4,798	45.35	–0.18
Antonio Broco Soto	Puerto Rican Independence Party	238	2.25	–0.60
Total		10,581	100.00	–
Popular Democratic Party hold				

Previous PPD mayor Edgardo Arlequín Vélez was suspended by his party on May 6, 2015, because he was accused of sexual harassment by an employee. It wasn't until January 13, 2016, until he resigned from his post. 28th district representative Nelson Torres Yordán resigned from his post in the House of Representatives to become mayor. While Héctor Rodríguez Rodríguez won the PNP primary, Torres Yordán ultimately was elected to serve a first full term in office.

=== Guaynabo ===
2016 Guaynabo mayoral election
Candidate	Party	Votes	%	+/–
Hector O'Neill Garcia (incumbent)	New Progressive Party	29,771	72.24	+12.29
Ricardo Vicéns	Popular Democratic Party	9,301	22.57	–11.21
Jaime Alonso Sánchez	Puerto Rican Independence Party	1,545	3.75	+1.20
Héctor Montalvo Rodríguez	Working People's Party	592	1.44	–0.43
Total		41,209	100.00	–
New Progressive Party hold				

Incumbent mayor Hector O'Neill Garcia won the PNP primary and his sixth term.

=== Gurabo ===
2016 Gurabo mayoral election
Candidate	Party	Votes	%	+/–
Víctor Ortiz Díaz (incumbent)	New Progressive Party	11,313	62.82	+9.41
Raúl Méndez Candelaria	Popular Democratic Party	5,953	33.05	–8.74
Eduardo Figueroa Rosa	Puerto Rican Independence Party	744	4.13	+1.92
Total		18,010	100.00	–
New Progressive Party hold				

Incumbent mayor Víctor Ortiz Díaz won the PNP primary and his fourth term.

=== Hatillo ===
2016 Hatillo mayoral election
Candidate	Party	Votes	%	+/–
José Rodríguez Cruz (incumbent)	Popular Democratic Party	12,321	68.23	+2.35
Wenceslao López	New Progressive Party	5,524	30.59	–1.91
Ubaldo Rosario Nieves	Puerto Rican Independence Party	214	1.19	+0.41
Total		18,059	100.00	–
Popular Democratic Party hold				

Incumbent mayor José Rodríguez Cruz won his fourth term.

=== Hormigueros ===
2016 Hormigueros mayoral election
Candidate	Party	Votes	%	+/–
Pedro García (incumbent)	Popular Democratic Party	5,737	69.25	+4.91
Augustine Olivencia	New Progressive Party	2,342	28.27	–4.50
Luis Mario Acevedo	Puerto Rican Independence Party	206	2.49	+0.74
Total		8,285	100.00	–
Popular Democratic Party hold				

Incumbent mayor Pedro García Figueroa won his fourth term.

=== Humacao ===
2016 Humacao mayoral election
Candidate	Party	Votes	%	+/–
Marcelo Trujillo (incumbent)	Popular Democratic Party	13,092	56.71	–10.65
Reinaldo Vargas Rodríguez	New Progressive Party	9,375	40.61	+10.33
Ricardo Díaz Maldonado	Puerto Rican Independence Party	420	1.82	+0.31
Luz Camacho Rivera	Working People's Party	199	0.86	New
Total		23,086	100.00	–
Popular Democratic Party hold				

Reinaldo Vargas Rodríguez won the PNP primary. Nonetheless, incumbent mayor Marcelo Trujillo Panisse won the PPD primary and his fifth term.

=== Isabela ===
2016 Isabela mayoral election
Candidate	Party	Votes	%	+/–
Carlos Delgado Altieri (incumbent)	Popular Democratic Party	12,521	62.82	+4.03
Juvencio Méndez Mercado	New Progressive Party	7,154	35.90	–3.48
Fidelio Román Zamot	Puerto Rican Independence Party	255	1.28	+0.33
Total		19,930	100.00	–
Popular Democratic Party hold				

Juvencio Méndez Mercado won the PPD primary. Nonetheless, incumbent PPD mayor Carlos Delgado Altieri won his fifth term.

=== Jayuya ===
2016 Jayuya mayoral election
Candidate	Party	Votes	%	+/–
Jorge González Otero (incumbent)	Popular Democratic Party	4,752	54.80	–1.75
Felix Morales Cruz	New Progressive Party	3,830	44.17	+2.21
Ernesto Dávila Marín	Puerto Rican Independence Party	89	1.03	+0.27
Total		8,671	100.00	–
Popular Democratic Party hold				

Incumbent mayor Jorge González Otero won his sixth term.

=== Juana Díaz ===
2016 Juana Díaz mayoral election
Candidate	Party	Votes	%	+/–
Ramón Hernández (incumbent)	Popular Democratic Party	12,486	61.44	+0.82
Ariel Rivera Zayas	New Progressive Party	7,196	35.41	–1.99
Rafael Rosario Rivera	Puerto Rican Independence Party	641	3.15	+1.83
Total		20,323	100.00	–
Popular Democratic Party hold				

Incumbent mayor Ramón Hernández Torres won his fifth term.

=== Juncos ===
2016 Juncos mayoral election
Candidate	Party	Votes	%	+/–
Alfredo Alejandro (Incumbent)	Popular Democratic Party	9,432	59.28	–7.09
Irma Beltrán Sánchez	New Progressive Party	6,068	38.14	+6.96
Carolina González Colón	Puerto Rican Independence Party	410	2.58	+1.25
Total		15,910	100.00	–
Popular Democratic Party hold				

Incumbent mayor Alfredo Alejandro Carrión won his fifth term.

=== Lajas ===
2016 Lajas mayoral election
Candidate	Party	Votes	%	+/–
Marcos Irizarry Pagán (incumbent)	Popular Democratic Party	6,204	57.11	–5.45
Erwin Álvarez	New Progressive Party	4,392	40.43	+6.79
Jaime Camacho Román	Puerto Rican Independence Party	267	2.46	–0.16
Total		10,863	100.00	–
Popular Democratic Party hold				

Incumbent mayor Marcos Irizarry Pagán won his second term.

=== Lares ===
2016 Lares mayoral election
Candidate	Party	Votes	%	+/–
Roberto Pagán (incumbent)	New Progressive Party	8,109	51.37	+0.65
José González	Popular Democratic Party	7,428	47.06	–0.12
Edia Quiñones	Puerto Rican Independence Party	248	1.57	+0.48
Total		15,785	100.00	–
New Progressive Party hold				

Incumbent mayor Roberto Pagán Centeno won the PNP primary and his fourth term.

=== Las Marías ===
2016 Las Marías mayoral election
Candidate	Party	Votes	%	+/–
Edwin Soto Santiago	New Progressive Party	3,106	50.40	+5.07
José Javier Rodríguez (incumbent)	Popular Democratic Party	2,979	48.34	–4.73
Carlos Cruz Carrión	Puerto Rican Independence Party	78	1.27	+0.43
Total		6,163	100.00	–
New Progressive Party hold				

Incumbent mayor José Javier Rodríguez ran for a second term, but lost to PNP candidate Edwin Soto Santiago, who won his fifth non-consecutive term.

=== Las Piedras ===
2016 Las Piedras mayoral election
Candidate	Party	Votes	%	+/–
Miguel López Rivera (Incumbent)	New Progressive Party	9,336	56.94	–2.13
Julio Díaz	Popular Democratic Party	6,705	40.89	+1.97
Gloria Santana Velázquez	Puerto Rican Independence Party	355	2.17	+1.06
Total		16,396	100.00	–
New Progressive Party hold				

Incumbent mayor Miguel López Rivera won his third term.

=== Loíza ===
2016 Loíza mayoral election
Candidate	Party	Votes	%	+/–
Julia Nazario Fuentes	Popular Democratic Party	5,956	54.03	+17.05
Eddie Manso Fuentes (incumbent)	New Progressive Party	4,880	44.27	–13.65
Samuel Quiñones Iglesias	Puerto Rican Independence Party	187	1.70	–0.04
Total		11,023	100.00	–
Popular Democratic Party gain from New Progressive Party				

Incumbent mayor Eddie Manso Fuentes ran for a fourth term, won the PNP primary, but lost to PPD candidate Julia Nazario Fuentes, ending 44 years of PNP control of the municipality.

=== Luquillo ===
2016 Luquillo mayoral election
Candidate	Party	Votes	%	+/–
Jesús Márquez (incumbent)	Popular Democratic Party	4,924	58.07	+6.43
Carlos Rodríguez Rivera	New Progressive Party	3,400	40.10	–6.01
Gloria Escobar Skerrett	Puerto Rican Independence Party	155	1.83	+0.44
Total		8,479	100.00	–
Popular Democratic Party hold				

Carlos Rodríguez Rivera won the PNP primary. Nonetheless, incumbent mayor Jesús Márquez Rodríguez won his third term.

=== Manatí ===
2016 Manatí mayoral election
Candidate	Party	Votes	%	+/–
José Sánchez González	New Progressive Party	14,765	78.40	+18.03
Brian Casais García	Popular Democratic Party	3,618	19.21	–14.88
María Digmar Rosa	Puerto Rican Independence Party	449	2.38	+0.76
Total		18,832	100.00	–
New Progressive Party hold				

Incumbent mayor Juan Cruz Manzano announced that he would not seek re-election, opting to retire after 40 years of being mayor. José Sánchez González won the PNP primary and the election.

=== Maricao ===
2016 Maricao mayoral election
Candidate	Party	Votes	%	+/–
Gilberto Pérez Valentín (incumbent)	New Progressive Party	1,818	51.78	–4.98
Wilfredo Ruiz Feliciano	Popular Democratic Party	1,675	47.71	+5.90
Maximino Rivera López	Puerto Rican Independence Party	18	0.51	–0.07
Total		3,511	100.00	–
New Progressive Party hold				

Wilfredo Ruiz Feliciano won the PPD primary. Nonetheless, incumbent mayor Gilberto Pérez Valentín won the PNP primary and his sixth term.

=== Maunabo ===
2016 Maunabo mayoral election
Candidate	Party	Votes	%	+/–
Jorge Márquez Pérez (incumbent)	Popular Democratic Party	3,199	49.94	–4.85
Eric Fernández García	New Progressive Party	3,048	47.58	+5.62
Juan Lebrón López	Puerto Rican Independence Party	159	2.48	+0.20
Total		6,406	100.00	–
Popular Democratic Party hold				

Incumbent mayor Jorge Márquez Pérez won his fifth term.

=== Mayagüez ===
2016 Mayagüez mayoral election
Candidate	Party	Votes	%	+/–
José Rodríguez (incumbent)	Popular Democratic Party	19,986	62.06	–0.45
Tania Lugo López	New Progressive Party	10,963	34.04	+0.55
Orlando Ruiz Pesante	Puerto Rican Independence Party	1,257	3.90	+1.45
Total		32,206	100.00	–
Popular Democratic Party hold				

Tania Lugo López won the PNP primary. Nonetheless, incumbent mayor José Rodríguez Rodríguez won his seventh term.

=== Moca ===
2016 Moca mayoral election
Candidate	Party	Votes	%	+/–
José Avilés Santiago (incumbent)	New Progressive Party	10,048	53.12	+3.61
Domingo Méndez	Popular Democratic Party	8,638	45.67	–2.24
Carlos Hernández Segui	Puerto Rican Independence Party	229	1.21	–0.01
Total		18,915	100.00	–
New Progressive Party hold				

Incumbent mayor José Avilés Santiago won the PNP primary and his fifth term.

=== Morovis ===
2016 Morovis mayoral election
Candidate	Party	Votes	%	+/–
Carmen Maldonado González	Popular Democratic Party	7,753	51.21	+7.04
Héctor Torres Calderón	New Progressive Party	7,233	47.78	–6.27
Oscar Fontán La Fontaine	Puerto Rican Independence Party	153	1.01	+0.04
Total		15,139	100.00	–
Popular Democratic Party gain from New Progressive Party				

Incumbent mayor Heriberto Rodríguez Adorno announced via Twitter that he would not seek re-election, opting to retire after 12 years of being mayor. 12th district representative Héctor Torres Calderón opted not to run for the House of Representatives to instead run for mayor, winning the PNP primary. Torres Calderón went on to lose to PPD candidate Carmen Maldonado González, ending 12 years of PNP control in the municipality.

=== Naguabo ===
2016 Naguabo mayoral election
Candidate	Party	Votes	%	+/–
Noé Marcano Rivera (incumbent)	New Progressive Party	8,081	77.25	+23.01
Wilma Rosa Méndez	Popular Democratic Party	2,190	20.93	–22.14
Giovanni Montañez	Puerto Rican Independence Party	190	1.82	–0.04
Total		10,461	100.00	–
New Progressive Party hold				

Incumbent mayor Noé Marcano Riveri won his second term.

=== Naranjito ===
2016 Naranjito mayoral election
Candidate	Party	Votes	%	+/–
Orlando Ortiz Chevres (incumbent)	New Progressive Party	9,486	58.68	+8.70
Jordan Rodriguez Rodriguez	Popular Democratic Party	6,361	39.35	+9.25
William Correa Rivera	Puerto Rican Independence Party	241	1.49	+0.37
Efrain Negron Rodriguez	Independent	78	0.48	New
Total		16,166	100.00	–
New Progressive Party hold				

Incumbent mayor Orlando Ortiz Chevres won his third term.

=== Orocovis ===
2016 Orocovis mayoral election
Candidate	Party	Votes	%	+/–
Jesús Colón Berlingeri (incumbent)	New Progressive Party	7,663	57.37	+6.14
Angelys Rivera	Popular Democratic Party	5,549	41.55	–6.27
Oscar Figueroa Betancourt	Puerto Rican Independence Party	144	1.08	+0.64
Total		13,356	100.00	–
New Progressive Party hold				

Incumbent mayor Jesús Colón Berlingeri won his sixth term.

=== Patillas ===
2016 Patillas mayoral election
Candidate	Party	Votes	%	+/–
Norberto Soto (incumbent)	Popular Democratic Party	5,304	55.31	+3.96
Maritza Sánchez Neris	New Progressive Party	4,108	42.84	–2.94
Luis Lebrón Ayala	Puerto Rican Independence Party	177	1.85	–0.06
Total		9,589	100.00	–
Popular Democratic Party hold				

Maritza Sánchez Neris won the PNP primary. Nonetheless, incumbent mayor Norberto Soto Figueroa won his second term.

=== Peñuelas ===
2016 Peñuelas mayoral election
Candidate	Party	Votes	%	+/–
Walter Torres (incumbent)	Popular Democratic Party	5,950	54.13	–1.36
Rafael Martínez	New Progressive Party	4,541	41.31	+0.24
Jimmy Borrero Costas	Puerto Rican Independence Party	501	4.56	+2.08
Total		10,992	100.00	–
Popular Democratic Party hold				

Incumbent mayor Walter Torres Maldonado won his sixth term.

=== Ponce ===
2016 Ponce mayoral election
Candidate	Party	Votes	%	+/–
María Meléndez Altieri (incumbent)	New Progressive Party	30,902	49.83	–5.11
Víctor Vassallo Anadón	Popular Democratic Party	25,798	41.60	–0.99
Ramón Rodríguez Ramos	Working People's Party	3,349	5.40	New
José Escabí Pérez	Puerto Rican Independence Party	1,964	3.17	+1.56
Total		62,013	100.00	–
New Progressive Party hold				

Incumbent mayor María Meléndez Altieri won the PNP primary and her third term. The Ponceños' Autonomous Movement, a local autonomous party that had candidates for 2008 and 2012, allied itself with the Working People's Party to nominate the candidate instead.

=== Quebradillas ===
2016 Quebradillas mayoral election
Candidate	Party	Votes	%	+/–
Heriberto Vélez Vélez (incumbent)	Popular Democratic Party	7,181	55.66	–6.65
Jeron Muñiz Lasalle	New Progressive Party	5,485	42.51	+7.58
Haydee Jiménez Hernández	Puerto Rican Independence Party	236	1.83	+0.16
Total		12,902	100.00	–
Popular Democratic Party hold				

Jeron Muñiz Lasalle won the PNP primary. Nonetheless, incumbent mayor Heriberto Vélez Vélez won his fourth term.

=== Rincón ===
2016 Rincón mayoral election
Candidate	Party	Votes	%	+/–
Carlos López Bonilla (incumbent)	Popular Democratic Party	4,344	58.42	–3.27
Roberto Feliciano Rosado	New Progressive Party	2,943	39.58	+3.21
Rogelio Bonet Aybar	Puerto Rican Independence Party	119	1.60	+0.64
Suhaey Rosario	Working People's Party	30	0.40	New
Total		7,436	100.00	–
Popular Democratic Party hold				

Incumbent mayor Carlos López Bonilla won the PPD primary and his fifth term.

=== Río Grande ===
2016 Río Grande mayoral election
Candidate	Party	Votes	%	+/–
Ángel González (incumbent)	Popular Democratic Party	10,673	55.26	–8.89
David Acosta Rodríguez	New Progressive Party	8,164	42.27	+8.70
Gaddier García García	Puerto Rican Independence Party	477	2.47	+1.15
Total		19,314	100.00	–
Popular Democratic Party hold				

Previous PPD mayor Eduard Rivera Correa was arrested by the FBI on July 10, 2014, for participating in a bribery scheme where he would receive money in exchange for contracting certain companies and suppliers. He resigned his post on September 2, 2014, and later on September 24, the CEE certified Ángel González Damudt as the new mayor of Río Grande. David Acosta Rodríguez won the PNP primary, but incumbent mayor González Damudt went on to win his first-full term.

=== Sabana Grande ===
2016 Sabana Grande mayoral election
Candidate	Party	Votes	%	+/–
Miguel Ortiz Vélez (incumbent)	Popular Democratic Party	6,668	55.73	+1.14
Alex López Rodríguez	New Progressive Party	4,979	41.62	–1.11
José Ortiz Lugo	Puerto Rican Independence Party	317	2.65	+0.85
Total		11,964	100.00	–
Popular Democratic Party hold				

Incumbent mayor Miguel Ortiz Vélez won his fifth term.

=== Salinas ===
2016 Salinas mayoral election
Candidate	Party	Votes	%	+/–
Karilyn Bonilla Colón (incumbent)	Popular Democratic Party	8,086	62.93	+11.74
Rafael Picó Seda	New Progressive Party	4,417	34.37	–12.18
Víctor Alvarado Guzmán	Puerto Rican Independence Party	347	2.70	+1.48
Total		12,850	100.00	–
Popular Democratic Party hold				

Rafael Picó Seda won the PNP primary. Nonetheless, Karilyn Bonilla Colón won her second term.

=== San Germán ===
2020 San Germán mayoral election
Candidate	Party	Votes	%	+/–
Virgilio Olivera Olivera	New Progressive Party	6,427	50.93	+8.95
Isidro Negrón Irizarry (incumbent)	Popular Democratic Party	5,173	40.99	–13.88
Julia Rita Rodríguez	Puerto Rican Independence Party	1,019	8.08	+4.93
Total		12,619	100.00	–
New Progressive Party gain from Popular Democratic Party				

Incumbent mayor Isidro Negrón Irizarry ran for a 6th term, won the PPD primary, but lost to Virgilio Olivera Olivera, ending 20 years of PPD control of the municipality.

=== San Juan ===
2016 San Juan mayoral election
Candidate	Party	Votes	%	+/–
Carmen Cruz Soto (incumbent)	Popular Democratic Party	78,808	52.54	+2.16
Leo Díaz Urbina	New Progressive Party	65,654	43.77	–3.33
Adrián González Costa	Puerto Rican Independence Party	4,227	2.82	+1.32
Antonio Carmona Báez	Working People's Party	1,312	0.87	+0.36
Total		150,001	100.00	–
Popular Democratic Party hold				

Leo Díaz Urbina won the PNP primary. Nonetheless, incumbent mayor Carmen Cruz Soto won her second term.

=== San Lorenzo ===
2016 San Lorenzo mayoral election
Candidate	Party	Votes	%	+/–
José Román Abreu (incumbent)	Popular Democratic Party	10,999	57.06	+2.56
Omar Galarza Pagán	New Progressive Party	7,967	41.33	–2.66
José Raúl Dávila Jr.	Puerto Rican Independence Party	309	1.60	+0.70
Total		19,275	100.00	–
Popular Democratic Party hold				

Omar Galarza Pagán won the PNP primary. Nonetheless, incumbent mayor José Román Abreu won his fifth term.

=== San Sebastián ===
2016 San Sebastián mayoral election
Candidate	Party	Votes	%	+/–
Javier Jiménez Pérez (incumbent)	New Progressive Party	13,277	67.84	+13.00
Samuel Vega Orta	Popular Democratic Party	5,755	29.41	–12.11
Pedro Méndez Acosta	Puerto Rican Independence Party	538	2.75	+0.63
Total		19,570	100.00	–
New Progressive Party hold				

Incumbent mayor Javier Jiménez Pérez won his fourth term.

=== Santa Isabel ===
2016 Santa Isabel mayoral election
Candidate	Party	Votes	%	+/–
Enrique Questell (incumbent)	New Progressive Party	5,174	51.34	–7.60
Marcos Martínez	Popular Democratic Party	4,734	46.98	+8.39
Héctor Mercado	Puerto Rican Independence Party	169	1.68	+0.45
Total		10,077	100.00	–
New Progressive Party hold				

Marcos Martínez won the PPD primary. Nonetheless, incumbent mayor Enrique Questell Alvarado won the PNP primary and his fourth term.

=== Toa Alta ===
2016 Toa Alta mayoral election
Candidate	Party	Votes	%	+/–
Clemente Agosto (incumbent)	Popular Democratic Party	14,870	51.81	+0.58
Ángel Gary Rodríguez	New Progressive Party	13,186	45.94	+1.72
Ediberto Rodríguez	Puerto Rican Independence Party	645	2.25	–0.16
Total		28,701	100.00	–
Popular Democratic Party hold				

Incumbent mayor Clemente Agosto Lugardo won his second term.

=== Toa Baja ===
2016 Toa Baja mayoral election
Candidate	Party	Votes	%	+/–
Bernardo Márquez García	New Progressive Party	25,544	74.17	+8.73
Carlos Costales González	Popular Democratic Party	7,986	23.19	–8.68
Justo Lozada Sánchez	Puerto Rican Independence Party	909	2.64	+1.11
Total		34,439	100.00	–
New Progressive Party hold				

Incumbent mayor Aníbal Vega Borges lost the PNP primary to Bernardo Márquez García. Márquez García went on to win the election.

=== Trujillo Alto ===
2016 Trujillo Alto mayoral election
Candidate	Party	Votes	%	+/–
José Cruz Cruz (incumbent)	Popular Democratic Party	18,139	63.43	–3.79
Emmanuel Huertas	New Progressive Party	9,025	31.56	+1.94
Wanda Alemán	Puerto Rican Independence Party	1,433	5.01	+3.31
Total		28,597	100.00	–
Popular Democratic Party hold				

Emmanuel Huertas won the PNP primary. Nonetheless, incumbent mayor José Cruz Cruz won his third term.

=== Utuado ===
2016 Utuado mayoral election
Candidate	Party	Votes	%	+/–
Ernesto Irizarry Salvá (incumbent)	Popular Democratic Party	8,181	52.44	+2.34
Jonathan Tossas	New Progressive Party	7,247	46.46	–0.77
Jean Viruet Serrano	Puerto Rican Independence Party	172	1.10	+0.31
Total		15,600	100.00	–
Popular Democratic Party hold				

Jonathan Tossas won the PNP primary. Nonetheless, incumbent mayor Ernesto Irizarry Salvá won his second term.

=== Vega Alta ===
2016 Vega Alta mayoral election
Candidate	Party	Votes	%	+/–
Oscar Santiago Martínez	Popular Democratic Party	7,607	49.40	+3.95
Isabelo Molina (incumbent)	New Progressive Party	7,450	48.38	–2.65
Luis Mercado Rosario	Puerto Rican Independence Party	342	2.22	+0.93
Total		15,399	100.00	–
Popular Democratic Party gain from New Progressive Party				

Incumbent mayor Isabelo Molina Hernandez ran for a fourth consecutive term (and sixth non-consecutive term), won the PNP primary, but lost to PPD primary winner Oscar Santiago Martínez, ending 12 years of PNP control of the municipality.

=== Vega Baja ===
2016 Vega Baja mayoral election
Candidate	Party	Votes	%	+/–
Marcos Cruz Molina (incumbent)	Popular Democratic Party	16,790	67.66	+6.30
José Galán Rojas	New Progressive Party	7,565	30.49	–5.94
Yalivette Valentín Vega	Puerto Rican Independence Party	460	1.85	+0.38
Total		24,815	100.00	–
Popular Democratic Party hold				

José Galán Rojas won the PNP primary. Nonetheless, incumbent mayor Marcos Cruz Molina won his second term.

=== Vieques ===
2016 Vieques mayoral election
Candidate	Party	Votes	%	+/–
Víctor Emeric (incumbent)	Popular Democratic Party	2,215	56.12	+4.33
Evelyn Delerme Camacho	New Progressive Party	1,505	38.13	–4.94
Teodoro Escobar Ayala	Independent	181	4.59	New
Indalecio Tirado Rosa	Puerto Rican Independence Party	46	1.17	+0.40
Total		3,947	100.00	–
Popular Democratic Party hold				

Evelyn Delerme Camacho won the PNP primary. Nonetheless, incumbent mayor Víctor Emeric Catarineau won his second term.

=== Villalba ===
2016 Villalba mayoral election
Candidate	Party	Votes	%	+/–
Luis Hernández Ortiz (incumbent)	Popular Democratic Party	7,702	50.55	+0.50
Melvin Vázquez Roche	New Progressive Party	7,367	48.35	–0.37
Neisha Vázquez Muñoz	Puerto Rican Independence Party	168	1.10	+0.33
Total		15,237	100.00	–
Popular Democratic Party hold				

Previous PPD mayor Waldemar Rivera Torres renounced to his post on January 13, 2013, before taking his oath for hid third term. Luis Hernández Ortiz was sworn in the very next day. While Melvin Vázquez Roche won the PNP primary, incumbent mayor Hernández Ortiz won his first full term in office.

=== Yabucoa ===
2016 Yabucoa mayoral election
Candidate	Party	Votes	%	+/–
Rafael Surillo Ruiz (incumbent)	Popular Democratic Party	10,416	56.99	+2.63
Javier Colón González	New Progressive Party	7,651	41.86	–2.36
Ángel Colón	Puerto Rican Independence Party	210	1.15	+0.20
Total		18,277	100.00	–
Popular Democratic Party hold				

Incumbent mayor Rafael Surillo Ruiz won the PPD primary and his second term.

=== Yauco ===
2016 Yauco mayoral election
Candidate	Party	Votes	%	+/–
Ángel Torres Ortiz	New Progressive Party	11,355	60.78	–0.25
Pedro Torres Rivera	Popular Democratic Party	6,481	34.69	–1.21
Luis Santiago	Puerto Rican Independence Party	847	4.53	+2.42
Total		18,683	100.00	–
New Progressive Party hold				

Incumbent mayor Abel Nazario Quiñones decided not to run for a fifth term, choosing instead to run at-large for the Senate of Puerto Rico. Ángel Torres Ortiz won the PNP primary and the election.
