= 2020 Puerto Rican municipal elections =

- November 3, 2020

All 78 municipalities
	Majority party	Minority party
Leader	José Román Abreu	Carlos Molina Rodríguez
Party	Popular Democratic	New Progressive
Alliance	Puerto Rico Mayors Association	Puerto Rico Mayors Federation
Leader since	February 7, 2019	February 1, 2017
Leader's seat	San Lorenzo (defeated)	Arecibo (defeated)
Seats before	45	33
Seats after	41	37
Seat change	▼4	▲4
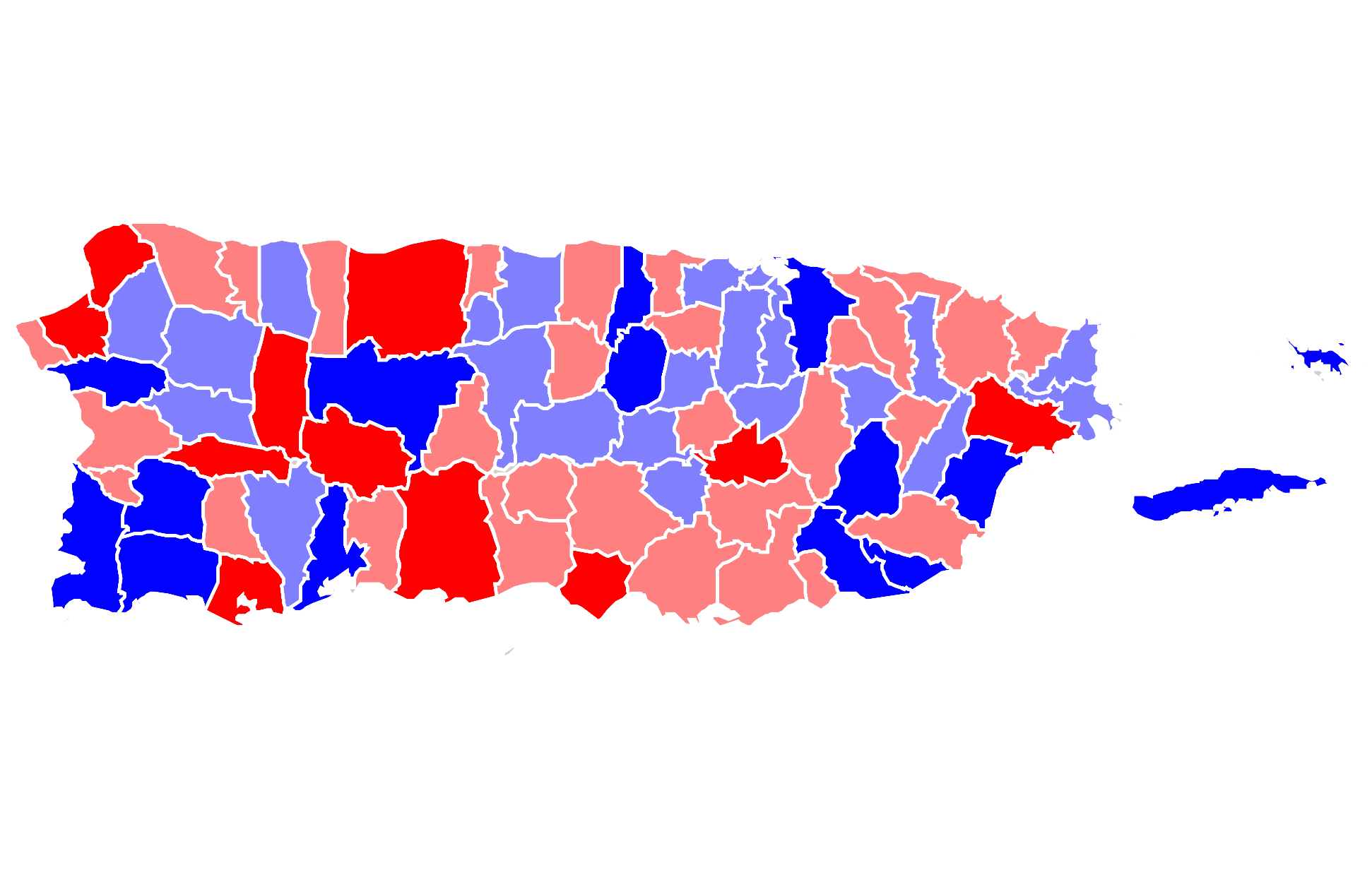
- Election results: PNP gain PPD gain PNP hold PPD hold

The 2020 Puerto Rican municipal election was held on November 3, 2020, to elect the mayors of the 78 municipalities of Puerto Rico, concurrently with the election of the Governor, the Resident Commissioner, the Senate, and the House of Representatives. As candidates in the 2020 general elections, the winners were elected to serve a four-year term from January 3, 2020, to January 3, 2025.

While the Popular Democratic Party kept most of the municipalities, its majority went down from 45 to 41. A total of 26 municipalities flipped parties, including many party strongholds, like Aguadilla (32 years under PNP) and Humacao (20 years under PPD).

== Results ==
=== Adjuntas ===
2020 Adjuntas mayoral election
Candidate	Party	Votes	%	+/–
José Soto Rivera	Popular Democratic Party	4,263	50.13	+12.76
Jaime Barlucea (incumbent)	New Progressive Party	4,001	47.05	–13.11
Carlos Sanabria Plaza	Puerto Rican Independence Party	240	2.82	+0.35
Total		8,504	100.00	–
Popular Democratic Party gain from New Progressive Party				

Incumbent mayor Jaime Barlucea Maldonado won the PNP primary. Barlucea lost the election to José Soto Rivera, ending the 12 years of PNP control of the municipality.

=== Aguada ===
2020 Aguada mayoral election
Candidate	Party	Votes	%	+/–
Christian Cortés Feliciano	Popular Democratic Party	10,362	58.37	+10.40
Luis Echevarría Santiago	New Progressive Party	6,966	39.24	–10.65
Luis Agront Sánchez	Puerto Rican Independence Party	423	2.38	+2.14
Total		17,751	100.00	–
Popular Democratic Party gain from New Progressive Party				

Incumbent PNP mayor Manuel Santiago Mendoza lost his party's primaries to Luis Echevarría Santiago. He went on to lose to PPD candidate Christian Cortés Feliciano.

=== Aguadilla ===
2020 Aguadilla mayoral election
Candidate	Party	Votes	%	+/–
Julio Roldán Concepción	Popular Democratic Party	8,863	46.83	+15.28
Yanitsia Irizarry Méndez (incumbent)	New Progressive Party	8,808	46.54	–19.09
Eliezer Ríos Santiago	Puerto Rican Independence Party	1,018	5.38	+3.57
Juan Rosario Soto	Independent	238	1.26	New
Total		18,927	100.00	–
Popular Democratic Party gain from New Progressive Party				

Previous PNP mayor Carlos Méndez Martínez renounced to his post on January 21, 2020, after 23 years in the job, stating "...it's time to rest and travel." Yanitsia Irizarry Méndez became interim mayor and won the PNP primary. She lost to PPD candidate Julio Roldán Concepción, ending 32 years of PNP control of the municipality.

=== Aguas Buenas ===
2020 Aguas Buenas mayoral election
Candidate	Party	Votes	%	+/–
Javier García Pérez (incumbent)	New Progressive Party	5,429	54.25	–7.95
Carlos Pagán Carrión	Independent	2,228	22.26	New
Nayda Rodríguez Hernández	Popular Democratic Party	1,200	11.99	–17.14
Luis Díaz	Puerto Rican Independence Party	1,150	11.49	+2.82
Total		10,007	100.00	–
New Progressive Party hold				

Incumbent mayor Javier García Pérez won his second term.

=== Aibonito ===
2020 Aibonito mayoral election
Candidate	Party	Votes	%	+/–
William Alicea Pérez (incumbent)	New Progressive Party	6,447	60.46	–10.80
Tomás Alvarado	Popular Democratic Party	3,696	34.66	+8.44
Peter Mattina Canales	Puerto Rican Independence Party	521	4.89	+2.37
Total		10,664	100.00	–
New Progressive Party hold				

Tomás Alvarado won the PPD primary. Nonetheless, incumbent mayor William Alicea Pérez won his fourth term.

=== Añasco ===
2020 Añasco mayoral election
Candidate	Party	Votes	%	+/–
Kabir Solares García	New Progressive Party	6,168	54.61	+10.05
Jorge Estévez Martínez (incumbent)	Popular Democratic Party	4,516	39.98	–13.87
Christian Santiago	Movimiento Victoria Ciudadana	411	3.64	New
Daizabeth Fred García	Puerto Rican Independence Party	192	1.70	+0.12
Raymond Waters Muñiz	Independent	8	0.07	New
Total		11,295	100.00	–
New Progressive Party gain from Popular Democratic Party				

Incumbent mayor Jorge Estévez Martínez ran for a 4th term, but lost to PNP primary winner Kabir Solares García, ending 12 years of PPD control of the municipality.

=== Arecibo ===
2020 Arecibo mayoral election
Candidate	Party	Votes	%	+/–
Carlos Ramírez Irizarry	Popular Democratic Party	19,903	61.23	+36.10
Carlos Molina Rodríguez (incumbent)	New Progressive Party	10,951	33.69	–38.43
Javier Biaggi Caballero	Puerto Rican Independence Party	1,651	5.08	+2.33
Total		32,505	100.00	–
Popular Democratic Party gain from New Progressive Party				

Incumbent mayor Carlos Molina Rodríguez ran for a 3rd term, won the PNP primary, but lost to PPD primary winner Carlos Ramírez Irizarry, ending 16 years of PNP control of the municipality.

=== Arroyo ===
2020 Arroyo mayoral election
Candidate	Party	Votes	%	+/–
Eric Bachier Román (incumbent)	Popular Democratic Party	4,886	80.96	+26.48
Roberto Cora López	New Progressive Party	855	14.17	–29.50
Miguel Sánchez Clavell	Puerto Rican Independence Party	294	4.87	+3.02
Total		6,035	100.00	–
Popular Democratic Party hold				

Incumbent mayor Eric Bachier Román won his third term.

=== Barceloneta ===
2020 Barceloneta mayoral election
Candidate	Party	Votes	%	+/–
Wanda Soler Rosario (incumbent)	Popular Democratic Party	7,935	75.15	+18.50
Balseiro Ángel	New Progressive Party	2,453	23.23	–19.03
Elvin Rivera Torres	Puerto Rican Independence Party	171	1.62	+0.54
Total		10,559	100.00	–
Popular Democratic Party hold				

Incumbent mayor Wanda Soler Rosario won the PPD primary and her third term.

=== Barranquitas ===
2020 Barranquitas mayoral election
Candidate	Party	Votes	%	+/–
Elliot Colón Blanco (incumbent)	New Progressive Party	6,483	49.58	–11.93
Luis Colón Santos	Popular Democratic Party	6,318	48.31	+12.43
Elsa Berríos López	Puerto Rican Independence Party	276	2.11	–0.50
Total		13,077	100.00	–
New Progressive Party hold				

Previous PNP mayor Francisco López López renounced to his post on September 18, 2019, after 22 years in the job. Later, on November 14, 2019, Elliot Colón Blanco was elected mayor in a special election to finish López's term. Colón Blanco was re-elected to serve his first full term in office.

=== Bayamón ===
2020 Bayamón mayoral election
Candidate	Party	Votes	%	+/–
Ramón Rivera Cruz (incumbent)	New Progressive Party	50,301	77.96	+4.60
Jorge Valldejuli Reyes	Popular Democratic Party	10,957	16.98	–6.71
Noel Berríos Díaz	Puerto Rican Independence Party	3,261	5.05	+2.10
Total		64,519	100.00	–
New Progressive Party hold				

Incumbent mayor Ramón Rivera Cruz won his sixth term.

=== Cabo Rojo ===
2020 Cabo Rojo mayoral election
Candidate	Party	Votes	%	+/–
Jorge Morales Wiscovitch	New Progressive Party	7,265	46.84	+3.76
Roberto Ramírez Kurtz (incumbent)	Popular Democratic Party	7,051	45.46	–7.67
Dagoberto Montalvo	Puerto Rican Independence Party	1,194	7.70	+3.91
Total		15,510	100.00	–
New Progressive Party gain from Popular Democratic Party				

Incumbent mayor Roberto Ramírez Kurtz ran for a 3rd term, but lost to PNP primary winner Jorge Morales Wiscovitch.

=== Caguas ===
2020 Caguas mayoral election
Candidate	Party	Votes	%	+/–
William Miranda Torres (incumbent)	Popular Democratic Party	20,370	44.82	–23.37
Roberto López	New Progressive Party	18,778	41.32	+11.88
Jason Domenech Miller	Puerto Rican Independence Party	6,300	13.86	+11.49
Total		45,448	100.00	–
Popular Democratic Party hold				

Roberto López won the PNP primary. Nonetheless, incumbent mayor William Miranda Torres won his third term.

=== Camuy ===
2020 Camuy mayoral election
Candidate	Party	Votes	%	+/–
Gabriel Hernández (incumbent)	New Progressive Party	8,666	57.15	+1.74
Jesmar Gerena Castro	Popular Democratic Party	6,057	39.95	–2.40
Monserrate Méndez Ramos	Puerto Rican Independence Party	440	2.90	+0.66
Total		15,163	100.00	–
New Progressive Party hold				

Previous PNP mayor Edwin García Feliciano renounced to his post on February 28, 2020, after 16 years in the job, to become the Ombudsman. Gabriel Hernández Rodríguez became mayor for the rest of his García Feliciano's term and won the election.

=== Canóvanas ===
2020 Canóvanas mayoral election
Candidate	Party	Votes	%	+/–
Lorna Soto Villanueva (incumbent)	New Progressive Party	7,312	50.50	–1.28
Awilda Iglesias Muñoz	Popular Democratic Party	6,337	43.77	–2.19
Luz González	Puerto Rican Independence Party	830	5.73	+3.47
Total		14,479	100.00	–
New Progressive Party hold				

Awilda Iglesias Muñoz won the PPD primary. Nonetheless, incumbent mayor Lorna Soto Villanueva won the PNP primary and her second term.

=== Carolina ===
2020 Carolina mayoral election
Candidate	Party	Votes	%	+/–
José Aponte Dalmau (incumbent)	Popular Democratic Party	34,679	67.68	–4.68
José Tanco Areizaga	New Progressive Party	12,800	24.98	–0.79
Emanuel Dufrasne González	Puerto Rican Independence Party	3,764	7.35	+5.49
Total		51,243	100.00	–
Popular Democratic Party hold				

Incumbent mayor José Aponte Dalmau won his fourth term.

=== Cataño ===
2020 Cataño mayoral election
Candidate	Party	Votes	%	+/–
Félix Delgado (incumbent)	New Progressive Party	7,847	77.51	+12.83
Norberto Torres Serrano	Popular Democratic Party	1,904	18.81	–14.56
William Candelario Nazario	Puerto Rican Independence Party	373	3.68	+1.73
Total		10,124	100.00	–
New Progressive Party hold				

Incumbent mayor Félix Delgado Montalvo won his second term.

=== Cayey ===
2020 Cayey mayoral election
Candidate	Party	Votes	%	+/–
Rolando Ortiz (incumbent)	Popular Democratic Party	12,397	78.38	+4.32
Luis Bruno Collazo	New Progressive Party	2,523	15.95	–6.89
Antonio Pérez Aponte	Puerto Rican Independence Party	897	5.67	+2.57
Total		15,817	100.00	–
Popular Democratic Party hold				

Incumbent mayor Rolando Ortiz Velázquez won his seventh term.

=== Ceiba ===
2020 Ceiba mayoral election
Candidate	Party	Votes	%	+/–
Samuel Rivera Báez	New Progressive Party	3,243	66.05	+3.83
Julio Arias	Popular Democratic Party	1,505	30.65	–5.67
Carlos Pino Pagán	Puerto Rican Independence Party	162	3.30	+1.85
Total		4,910	100.00	–
New Progressive Party hold				

Incumbent mayor Angelo Cruz Ramos lost the PNP primary to Samuel Rivera Báez. Rivera Báez went on to win the election.

=== Ciales ===
2020 Ciales mayoral election
Candidate	Party	Votes	%	+/–
Alexander Burgos Otero	New Progressive Party	4,221	49.01	–1.41
José Carrer González	Popular Democratic Party	3,672	42.64	–6.02
Ángel Tirado	Independent	512	5.95	New
José Ríos Piñeiro	Puerto Rican Independence Party	207	2.40	+1.49
Total		8,612	100.00	–
New Progressive Party hold				

Previous PNP mayor Luis Maldonado Rodríguez announced on September 21, 2018, that he would not seek re-election for a 4th term. Alexander Burgos Otero won the PNP primary, while José Carrer González won the PPD primary. Alexander Burgos Otero ultimately won the mayoral race.

=== Cidra ===
2020 Cidra mayoral election
Candidate	Party	Votes	%	+/–
David Concepción González	Popular Democratic Party	8,611	55.96	+23.00
Javier Carrasquillo Cruz (incumbent)	New Progressive Party	5,660	36.78	–26.53
Jorge Tirado	Puerto Rican Independence Party	1,116	7.25	+3.52
Total		15,387	100.00	–
Popular Democratic Party gain from New Progressive Party				

Incumbent mayor Javier Carrasquillo Cruz ran for a 3rd therm, but lost to PPD candidate David Concepción González.

=== Coamo ===
2020 Coamo mayoral election
Candidate	Party	Votes	%	+/–
Juan García Padilla (incumbent)	Popular Democratic Party	8,653	64.16	+6.10
Ingrid Morales	New Progressive Party	4,435	32.89	–7.50
Nelson Rodríguez Bonilla	Puerto Rican Independence Party	398	2.95	+1.40
Total		13,486	100.00	–
Popular Democratic Party hold				

Incumbent mayor Juan García Padilla won his sixth term.

=== Comerío ===
2020 Comerío mayoral election
Candidate	Party	Votes	%	+/–
José Santiago Rivera (incumbent)	Popular Democratic Party	4,517	57.19	+0.37
Dennis Agosto Vázquez	New Progressive Party	2,910	36.84	–5.12
Cristian González	Movimiento Victoria Ciudadana	301	3.81	New
Raúl Rivera Díaz	Puerto Rican Independence Party	170	2.15	+0.93
Total		7,898	100.00	–
Popular Democratic Party hold				

Incumbent mayor José Santiago Rivera won his sixth term.

=== Corozal ===
2020 Corozal mayoral election
Candidate	Party	Votes	%	+/–
Luis García Rolón	New Progressive Party	9,016	58.31	+14.01
Sergio Torres Torres (incumbent)	Popular Democratic Party	5,971	38.62	–15.82
Andrés Miranda Rosado	Puerto Rican Independence Party	475	3.07	+1.81
Total		15,462	100.00	–
New Progressive Party gain from Popular Democratic Party				

Incumbent mayor Sergio Torres Torres ran for a 3rd term, won the PPD primary, but lost to PNP candidate Luis García Rolón.

=== Culebra ===
2020 Culebra mayoral election
Candidate	Party	Votes	%	+/–
Edilberto Romero Llovet	New Progressive Party	570	49.31	+7.35
Iván Solís Bermúdez (incumbent)	Popular Democratic Party	558	48.27	–9.13
Dolly Camareno Díaz	Puerto Rican Independence Party	28	2.42	+1.78
Total		1,156	100.00	–
New Progressive Party gain from Popular Democratic Party				

Incumbent mayor Iván Solís Bermúdez ran for a 3rd term, but lost to Edilberto Romero Llovet.

=== Dorado ===
2020 Dorado mayoral election
Candidate	Party	Votes	%	+/–
Carlos López Rivera (incumbent)	Popular Democratic Party	8,504	59.92	+8.50
Waldemar Volmar Méndez	New Progressive Party	5,156	36.33	–10.40
José Fernández Pagán	Puerto Rican Independence Party	532	3.75	+1.90
Total		14,192	100.00	–
Popular Democratic Party hold				

Incumbent mayor Carlos López Rivera won his ninth term.

=== Fajardo ===
2020 Fajardo mayoral election
Candidate	Party	Votes	%	+/–
José Meléndez (incumbent)	New Progressive Party	6,139	71.03	+1.68
Manuel Alvira Carmona	Popular Democratic Party	1,706	19.74	–7.62
Antonio Prieto Colón	Puerto Rican Independence Party	798	9.23	+7.30
Total		8,643	100.00	–
New Progressive Party hold				

Previous PNP mayor Aníbal Meléndez Rivera renounced to his post on February 19, 2020, after 31 years in the job. His son, José Meléndez Méndez became mayor for the rest of his father's term, won the PNP primary and the election.

=== Florida ===
2020 Florida mayoral election
Candidate	Party	Votes	%	+/–
José Gerena Polanco (incumbent)	New Progressive Party	3,447	71.59	+18.84
Edwin Santiago	Popular Democratic Party	1,084	22.51	–22.89
Luciano Colón Declet	Puerto Rican Independence Party	284	5.90	+4.05
Total		4,815	100.00	–
New Progressive Party hold				

Incumbent mayor José Gerena Polanco won his third term.

=== Guánica ===
2020 Guánica mayoral election
Candidate	Party	Votes	%	+/–
Ismael Rodríguez Ramos	Popular Democratic Party	2,384	33.22	–6.18
Edgardo Cruz Vélez	Write-in candidate	2,373	33.06	New
Santos Seda (incumbent)	New Progressive Party	2,330	32.46	–26.20
María Ruíz Ramos	Puerto Rican Independence Party	90	1.25	–0.67
Total		7,177	100.00	–
Popular Democratic Party gain from New Progressive Party				

Both PPD candidate Ismael Rodríguez Ramos and Write-In candidate Edgardo Cruz Vélez claimed victory, with the official count stating that Cruz Vélez was the winner. The case was taken to court, where it was determined that 38 votes had been duplicated, and had to be eliminated, giving Rodíguez Ramos the win. After multiple court revisions, Rodíguez Ramos was declared the official winner, and ratified as mayor of Guánica.

=== Guayama ===
2020 Guayama mayoral election
Candidate	Party	Votes	%	+/–
Eduardo Cintrón (incumbent)	Popular Democratic Party	7,620	56.49	+4.01
Fernando Sanabria Colón	New Progressive Party	5,228	38.76	–6.74
José De Jesús Peña	Puerto Rican Independence Party	641	4.75	+2.73
Total		13,489	100.00	–
Popular Democratic Party hold				

Incumbent mayor Eduardo Cintrón Suárez won his third term.

=== Guayanilla ===
2020 Guayanilla mayoral election
Candidate	Party	Votes	%	+/–
Raúl Rivera Rodríguez	New Progressive Party	4,788	56.42	+11.07
Nelson Torres Yordán (incumbent)	Popular Democratic Party	3,375	39.77	–12.64
Rosita Leomaris Hernández	Puerto Rican Independence Party	324	3.82	+1.57
Total		8,487	100.00	–
New Progressive Party gain from Popular Democratic Party				

Incumbent mayor Nelson Torres Yordán ran for a second term, but lost to PNP candidate Raúl Rivera Rodríguez, ending 20 years of PPD control of the municipality.

=== Guaynabo ===
2020 Guaynabo mayoral election
Candidate	Party	Votes	%	+/–
Ángel Pérez Otero (incumbent)	New Progressive Party	21,806	62.01	–10.23
Elba Beatriz Rivera	Popular Democratic Party	9,592	27.28	+4.71
Jaime Alonso Sánchez	Puerto Rican Independence Party	3,769	10.72	+6.97
Total		35,167	100.00	–
New Progressive Party hold				

Previous PNP mayor Hector O'Neill Garcia was suspended on May 24, 2017, on complaints filled against him for sexual harassment, and then resigned on June 5, 2017. Later, on August 7, 2017, Ángel Pérez Otero was elected mayor in a special election to finish O'Neill Garcia's term. Pérez Otero was re-elected to serve her first full term in office.

=== Gurabo ===
2020 Gurabo mayoral election
Candidate	Party	Votes	%	+/–
Rosachely Rivera (incumbent)	New Progressive Party	10,766	70.24	+7.42
Carmen Rosa García	Popular Democratic Party	3,313	21.61	–11.44
María Ramírez Pagán	Puerto Rican Independence Party	1,249	8.15	+4.02
Total		15,328	100.00	–
New Progressive Party hold				

Previous PNP mayor Víctor Ortiz Díaz was arrested on December 7, 2016, on charges related to extortion and soliciting a bribe. Later, on April 2, 2017, Rosachely Rivera Santana was elected mayor in a special election to finish Ortiz Díaz's term. Rivera Santana was re-elected to serve her first full term in office.

=== Hatillo ===
2020 Hatillo mayoral election
Candidate	Party	Votes	%	+/–
José Rodríguez Cruz (incumbent)	Popular Democratic Party	9,461	66.57	–1.66
Alex Torres Guzmán	New Progressive Party	4,275	30.08	–0.51
Damaris Mangual Vélez	Puerto Rican Independence Party	477	3.36	+2.17
Total		14,213	100.00	–
Popular Democratic Party hold				

Incumbent mayor José Rodríguez Cruz won his fifth term.

=== Hormigueros ===
2020 Hormigueros mayoral election
Candidate	Party	Votes	%	+/–
Pedro García (incumbent)	Popular Democratic Party	4,604	70.81	+1.56
Raymond Vega Ramos	New Progressive Party	1,553	23.88	–4.39
Alberto Fuentes Lorenzo	Puerto Rican Independence Party	345	5.31	+2.82
Total		6,502	100.00	–
Popular Democratic Party hold				

Incumbent mayor Pedro García Figueroa won his fifth term.

=== Humacao ===
2020 Humacao mayoral election
Candidate	Party	Votes	%	+/–
Reinaldo Vargas Rodríguez	New Progressive Party	9,270	48.57	+7.96
Luis Sánchez (incumbent)	Popular Democratic Party	8,575	44.93	–11.78
Loubriel Cruz Guzmán	Puerto Rican Independence Party	1,241	6.50	+4.68
Total		19,086	100.00	–
New Progressive Party gain from Popular Democratic Party				

Previous PPD mayor Marcelo Trujillo Panisse died while in office on September 15, 2019. Later, on November 10, 2019, Luis Sánchez Hernández was elected mayor in a special election to finish Trujillo Panisse's term. Reinaldo Vargas Rodríguez won the PNP primary. Vargas won the election, ending 20 years of PPD control of the municipality.

=== Isabela ===
2020 Isabela mayoral election
Candidate	Party	Votes	%	+/–
Miguel Méndez Pérez	Popular Democratic Party	11,334	64.61	+1.79
Melvin Concepción Corchado	New Progressive Party	5,623	32.05	–3.85
Cindy Candelario Feliciano	Puerto Rican Independence Party	585	3.33	+2.05
Total		17,542	100.00	–
Popular Democratic Party hold				

Incumbent PPD mayor Carlos Delgado Altieri announced he would not seek re-election, instead opting to run for governor. Miguel Méndez Pérez won the PPD primary, beating 3 other candidates, including the incumbent mayor's son, Carlos Delgado Irizarry. Melvin Concepción Corchado won the PNP primary. Méndez ultimately won the election.

=== Jayuya ===
2020 Jayuya mayoral election
Candidate	Party	Votes	%	+/–
Jorge González Otero (incumbent)	Popular Democratic Party	3,883	51.70	–3.10
Elvin Rodríguez Pagán	New Progressive Party	3,465	46.13	+1.96
Félix González Mercado	Puerto Rican Independence Party	163	2.17	+1.14
Total		7,511	100.00	–
Popular Democratic Party hold				

Elvin Rodríguez Pagán won the PNP primary. Nonetheless, incumbent mayor Jorge González Otero won his seventh term.

=== Juana Díaz ===
2020 Juana Díaz mayoral election
Candidate	Party	Votes	%	+/–
Ramón Hernández (incumbent)	Popular Democratic Party	10,883	67.39	+5.95
Pablo Rodríguez Germain	New Progressive Party	4,252	26.33	–9.08
Juan Rosario Ramos	Puerto Rican Independence Party	1,015	6.28	+3.13
Total		16,150	100.00	–
Popular Democratic Party hold				

Incumbent mayor Ramón Hernández Torres won his sixth term.

=== Juncos ===
2020 Juncos mayoral election
Candidate	Party	Votes	%	+/–
Alfredo Alejandro (incumbent)	Popular Democratic Party	6,908	52.96	–6.32
William Serrano	New Progressive Party	5,319	40.78	+2.64
Ricardo Quiles González	Puerto Rican Independence Party	817	6.26	+3.68
Total		13,044	100.00	–
Popular Democratic Party hold				

Incumbent mayor Alfredo Alejandro Carrión won his sixth term.

=== Lajas ===
2020 Lajas mayoral election
Candidate	Party	Votes	%	+/–
Jayson Martínez Maldonado	New Progressive Party	4,678	52.93	+12.50
Marcos Irizarry Pagán (incumbent)	Popular Democratic Party	3,872	43.81	–12.30
Wilson Sánchez Casiano	Puerto Rican Independence Party	288	3.26	+0.80
Total		8,838	100.00	–
New Progressive Party gain from Popular Democratic Party				

Incumbent mayor Marcos Irizarry Pagán ran for a 3rd term, won the PPD primary, but lost to PNP candidate Jayson Martínez Maldonado.

=== Lares ===
2020 Lares mayoral election
Candidate	Party	Votes	%	+/–
Fabián Arroyo Rodríguez	Popular Democratic Party	7,132	50.14	+3.08
José Rodríguez Ruiz (incumbent)	New Progressive Party	6,667	46.87	–4.50
Sherwin Quiles Delgado	Puerto Rican Independence Party	424	2.98	+1.41
Total		14,223	100.00	–
Popular Democratic Party gain from New Progressive Party				

Previous mayor Roberto Pagán Centeno renounced to his post on January 3, 2020, after 16 years in the job. The municipal committee quickly confirmed Pagán Centeno's son, Carlos Pagán Crespo as a candidate for mayor, without waiting for the PNP directory's orders. The directory's evaluating committee ultimately rejected Pagán Crespo's candidacy for endorsing independent candidate Abel Nazario Quiñones for the senate. After that, José Rodríguez Ruiz became mayor and ran for a full term in office, but lost to PPD candidate Fabián Arroyo Rodríguez.

=== Las Marías ===
2020 Las Marías mayoral election
Candidate	Party	Votes	%	+/–
Edwin Soto Santiago (incumbent)	New Progressive Party	3,124	54.96	+4.56
Willis Cruz Muñiz	Popular Democratic Party	2,488	43.77	–4.56
Carlos Cruz Carrión	Puerto Rican Independence Party	72	1.27	Steady
Total		5,684	100.00	–
New Progressive Party hold				

Incumbent mayor Edwin Soto Santiago won his second term.

=== Las Piedras ===
2020 Las Piedras mayoral election
Candidate	Party	Votes	%	+/–
Miguel López Rivera (incumbent)	New Progressive Party	8,173	61.01	+4.07
José Márquez	Popular Democratic Party	3,978	29.69	–11.20
Jesús Vélez Méndez	Puerto Rican Independence Party	1,246	9.30	+7.13
Total		13,397	100.00	–
New Progressive Party hold				

Incumbent mayor Miguel López Rivera won his fourth term.

=== Loíza ===
2020 Loíza mayoral election
Candidate	Party	Votes	%	+/–
Julia Nazario Fuentes (incumbent)	Popular Democratic Party	6,536	71.97	+17.94
Lymarie Escobar Quiñones	New Progressive Party	2,373	26.13	–18.14
Carlos Márquez Arroyo	Puerto Rican Independence Party	172	1.89	+0.19
Total		9,081	100.00	–
Popular Democratic Party hold				

Lymarie Escobar Quiñones won the PNP primary. Nonetheless, incumbent mayor Julia Nazario Fuentes won her second term.

=== Luquillo ===
2020 Luquillo mayoral election
Candidate	Party	Votes	%	+/–
Jesús Márquez (incumbent)	Popular Democratic Party	3,347	53.10	–4.97
Luis Rodríguez Díaz	New Progressive Party	2,717	43.11	+3.01
María Rexach Osorio	Puerto Rican Independence Party	239	3.79	+1.96
Total		6,303	100.00	–
Popular Democratic Party hold				

Incumbent mayor Jesús Márquez Rodríguez won his fourth term.

=== Manatí ===
2020 Manatí mayoral election
Candidate	Party	Votes	%	+/–
José Sánchez (incumbent)	New Progressive Party	8,536	64.40	–14.00
Bienvenido Collazo	Popular Democratic Party	3,988	30.09	+10.88
Eric Martínez Martínez	Puerto Rican Independence Party	731	5.51	+3.13
Total		13,255	100.00	–
New Progressive Party hold				

Incumbent mayor José Sánchez González won his second term.

=== Maricao ===
2020 Maricao mayoral election
Candidate	Party	Votes	%	+/–
Wilfredo Ruiz Feliciano	Popular Democratic Party	1,779	53.20	+5.49
Gilberto Pérez Valentín (incumbent)	New Progressive Party	1,550	46.35	–5.43
Porfirio Cuba Torres	Puerto Rican Independence Party	15	0.45	–0.06
Total		3,344	100.00	–
Popular Democratic Party gain from New Progressive Party				

Incumbent mayor Gilberto Pérez Valentín ran for a 7th term, won the PNP primary, but lost to Wilfredo Ruiz Feliciano, ending 28 years of PNP control of the municipality.

=== Maunabo ===
2020 Maunabo mayoral election
Candidate	Party	Votes	%	+/–
Ángel Lafuente Amaro	New Progressive Party	2,762	50.29	+2.71
Jorge Márquez Pérez (incumbent)	Popular Democratic Party	2,554	46.50	–3.44
Nelson Vázquez Rodríguez	Puerto Rican Independence Party	176	3.20	+0.72
Total		5,492	100.00	–
New Progressive Party gain from Popular Democratic Party				

Incumbent mayor Jorge Márquez Pérez ran for 6th term, but lost to PNP candidate Ángel Lafuente Amaro, ending 20 years of PPD control in the municipality.

=== Mayagüez ===
2020 Mayagüez mayoral election
Candidate	Party	Votes	%	+/–
José Rodríguez (incumbent)	Popular Democratic Party	11,570	46.33	–15.73
Tania Lugo López	New Progressive Party	10,194	40.82	+6.78
Orlando Ruiz Pesante	Puerto Rican Independence Party	3,211	12.86	+8.96
Total		24,975	100.00	–
Popular Democratic Party hold				

Tania Lugo López won the PNP primary. Nonetheless, incumbent mayor José Rodríguez Rodríguez won his eighth term.

=== Moca ===
2020 Moca mayoral election
Candidate	Party	Votes	%	+/–
Ángel Pérez Rodríguez	New Progressive Party	8,342	53.63	+0.51
Elliot Hernández	Popular Democratic Party	6,779	43.58	–2.09
Carlos Hernández Segui	Puerto Rican Independence Party	434	2.79	+1.58
Total		15,555	100.00	–
New Progressive Party hold				

Previous PNP mayor José Avilés Santiago confirmed on October 24, 2018, that he would not run for re-election, leaving after 20 years as mayor. Ángel Pérez Rodríguez ended up winning PNP primary and the mayoral seat.

=== Morovis ===
2020 Morovis mayoral election
Candidate	Party	Votes	%	+/–
Carmen Maldonado (incumbent)	Popular Democratic Party	8,679	66.18	+14.97
Olvin Santiago	New Progressive Party	4,278	32.62	–15.16
Oscar Fontán	Puerto Rican Independence Party	158	1.20	+0.19
Total		13,115	100.00	–
Popular Democratic Party hold				

Incumbent mayor Carmen Maldonado González won her second term.

=== Naguabo ===
2020 Naguabo mayoral election
Candidate	Party	Votes	%	+/–
Miraidaliz Rosario Pagán	Popular Democratic Party	4,480	52.94	+32.01
Noé Marcano Rivera (incumbent)	New Progressive Party	3,644	43.06	–34.19
Alexeis Quiñones	Puerto Rican Independence Party	339	4.01	+2.19
Total		8,463	100.00	–
Popular Democratic Party gain from New Progressive Party				

Incumbent mayor Noé Marcano Riveri ran for a 3rd term, won the PNP primary, but lost to Miraidaliz Rosario Pagán, ending 12 years of PNP control of the municipality.

=== Naranjito ===
2020 Naranjito mayoral election
Candidate	Party	Votes	%	+/–
Orlando Ortiz Chevres (incumbent)	New Progressive Party	7,336	53.02	–5.66
Joel Chevres Santiago	Popular Democratic Party	5,968	43.13	+3.78
William Correa Rivera	Puerto Rican Independence Party	532	3.85	+2.36
Total		13,836	100.00	–
New Progressive Party hold				

Joel Chevres Santiago won the PPD primary overwhelmingly Nonetheless, incumbent mayor Orlando Ortiz Chevres won his fourth term.

=== Orocovis ===
2020 Orocovis mayoral election
Candidate	Party	Votes	%	+/–
Jesús Colón Berlingeri (incumbent)	New Progressive Party	6,142	57.32	–0.05
Ángel Burgos Castro	Popular Democratic Party	4,280	39.94	–1.61
Oscar Figueroa Betancourt	Puerto Rican Independence Party	293	2.73	+1.65
Total		10,715	100.00	–
New Progressive Party hold				

Incumbent mayor Jesús Colón Berlingeri won his seventh term in office.

=== Patillas ===
2020 Patillas mayoral election
Candidate	Party	Votes	%	+/–
Maritza Sánchez Neris	New Progressive Party	3,418	47.56	+5.25
Norberto Soto Figueroa (incumbent)	Popular Democratic Party	3,264	45.42	–9.89
Catalino Santiago	Puerto Rican Independence Party	504	7.01	+5.16
Total		7,186	100.00	–
New Progressive Party gain from Popular Democratic Party				

Incumbent mayor Norberto Soto Figueroa ran for a 3rd term, but lost to PNP candidate Maritza Sánchez Neris.

=== Peñuelas ===
2020 Peñuelas mayoral election
Candidate	Party	Votes	%	+/–
Gregory Gonsález (incumbent)	Popular Democratic Party	5,377	55.75	+1.62
Josean González Febres	New Progressive Party	3,865	40.08	–1.23
Bethsaida Bosa Matos	Puerto Rican Independence Party	402	4.17	–0.39
Total		9,644	100.00	–
Popular Democratic Party hold				

Previous PPD mayor Walter Torres Maldonado renounced to his post on December 31, 2018, after 21 years in the job. The party, knowing beforehand that Torres Maldonado was going to renounce, did an internal primary in the municipality, with Gregory Gonsález Souchet being chosen as the new mayor. While Josean González Febres won PNP primary, the incumbent mayor Gregory Gonsález Souchet won his first full term.

=== Ponce ===
2020 Ponce mayoral election
Candidate	Party	Votes	%	+/–
Luis Irizarry Pabón	Popular Democratic Party	30,117	61.77	+20.17
María Meléndez Altieri (incumbent)	New Progressive Party	13,099	26.87	–22.96
Ramón Rodríguez Ramos	Movimiento Victoria Ciudadana	3,053	6.26	+0.86 (Note: Ramón Rodríguez Ramos ran under the Working People's Party in 2016)
José Víctor Madera	Puerto Rican Independence Party	2,488	5.10	+1.93
Total		48,757	100.00	–
Popular Democratic Party gain from New Progressive Party				

Incumbent mayor María Meléndez Altieri ran for a 4th term, won the PNP primary, but lost to PPD primary winner Luis Irizarry Pabón, ending 12 years of PNP control of the municipality.

=== Quebradillas ===
2020 Quebradillas mayoral election
Candidate	Party	Votes	%	+/–
Heriberto Vélez Vélez (incumbent)	Popular Democratic Party	6,109	62.79	+7.13
David Rivera Nieves	New Progressive Party	3,136	32.23	–10.28
Ángel Castillo Castillo	Puerto Rican Independence Party	484	4.97	+3.14
Total		9,729	100.00	–
Popular Democratic Party hold				

Incumbent mayor Heriberto Vélez Vélez won his fifth term.

=== Rincón ===
2020 Rincón mayoral election
Candidate	Party	Votes	%	+/–
Carlos López Bonilla (incumbent)	Popular Democratic Party	3,174	52.46	–5.96
Josué Moreno Rivera	New Progressive Party	1,689	27.92	–11.66
Enid Señeriz Ortiz	Movimiento Victoria Ciudadana	1,099	18.17	New
Rogelio Bonet Aybar	Puerto Rican Independence Party	88	1.45	–0.15
Total		6,050	100.00	–
Popular Democratic Party hold				

Incumbent mayor Carlos López Bonilla won the PPD primary and his sixth term.

=== Río Grande ===
2020 Río Grande mayoral election
Candidate	Party	Votes	%	+/–
Ángel González (incumbent)	Popular Democratic Party	11,216	70.52	+15.26
Mayra Pérez Bulerín	New Progressive Party	4,018	25.26	–17.01
Fernando Fortuño Colón	Puerto Rican Independence Party	670	4.21	+1.74
Total		15,904	100.00	–
Popular Democratic Party hold				

Mayra Pérez Bulerín won the PNP primary. Nonetheless, incumbent mayor Ángel González Damudt won the PPD primary and his second term.

=== Sabana Grande ===
2020 Sabana Grande mayoral election
Candidate	Party	Votes	%	+/–
Marcos Valentín Flores	Popular Democratic Party	5,215	55.50	–0.23
Luis Flores Santiago	New Progressive Party	3,563	37.92	–3.70
José Santiago Vélez	Puerto Rican Independence Party	619	6.59	+3.94
Total		9,397	100.00	–
Popular Democratic Party hold				

Previous PPD mayor Miguel Ortiz Vélez was arrested on July 5, 2018, for running a corruption scheme, With Noel Matías Borrero working as interim mayor and later mayor till the end of the term. Luis Flores Santiago won the PNP primary, while Marcos Valentín Flores won the PPD primary. Marcos Valentín Flores ultimately won the mayoral race.

=== Salinas ===
2020 Salinas mayoral election
Candidate	Party	Votes	%	+/–
Karilyn Bonilla Colón (incumbent)	Popular Democratic Party	6,521	65.29	+2.36
Raúl Zayas Rodríguez	New Progressive Party	2,859	28.62	–5.75
Litzy Alvarado Antonetty	Puerto Rican Independence Party	608	6.09	+3.39
Total		9,988	100.00	–
Popular Democratic Party hold				

Raúl Zayas Rodríguez won the PNP primary. Nonetheless, Karilyn Bonilla Colón won her third term.

=== San Germán ===
2020 San Germán mayoral election
Candidate	Party	Votes	%	+/–
Virgilio Olivera Olivera	New Progressive Party	6,427	50.93	+8.95
Isidro Negrón Irizarry (incumbent)	Popular Democratic Party	5,173	40.99	–13.88
Julia Rita Rodríguez	Puerto Rican Independence Party	1,019	8.08	+4.93
Total		12,619	100.00	–
New Progressive Party gain from Popular Democratic Party				

Incumbent mayor Isidro Negrón Irizarry ran for a 6th term, won the PPD primary, but lost to Virgilio Olivera Olivera, ending 20 years of PPD control of the municipality.

=== San Juan ===
2020 San Juan mayoral election
Candidate	Party	Votes	%	+/–
Miguel Romero Lugo	New Progressive Party	46,427	36.60	–7.17
Manuel Natal Albelo	Movimiento Victoria Ciudadana	42,962	33.87	New
Rossana López León	Popular Democratic Party	29,451	23.22	–30.32
Adrián González Costa	Puerto Rican Independence Party	4,157	3.28	+0.46
Nelson Rosario Rodríguez	Proyecto Dignidad	3,848	3.03	New
Total		126,845	100.00	–
New Progressive Party gain from Popular Democratic Party				

Incumbent PPD mayor Carmen Yulín Cruz announced she would not seek re-election, instead opting to run for governor. Miguel Romero Lugo won the PNP primary, and later the mayoral race. The major surprise was that the PPD candidate Rossana López León came 3rd, while MVC candidate Manuel Natal Albelo came in a very close second. It was the only municipality to have a mayoral candidate of every party running in the election.

=== San Lorenzo ===
2020 San Lorenzo mayoral election
Candidate	Party	Votes	%	+/–
Jaime Alverio Ramos	New Progressive Party	7,669	48.79	+7.46
José Román Abreu (incumbent)	Popular Democratic Party	7,467	47.51	–9.55
Isabel Reyes	Puerto Rican Independence Party	582	3.70	+2.10
Total		15,718	100.00	–
New Progressive Party gain from Popular Democratic Party				

Jaime Alverio Ramos won against incumbent mayor José Román Abreu, ending 20 years of PPD control of the municipality.

=== San Sebastián ===
2020 San Sebastián mayoral election
Candidate	Party	Votes	%	+/–
Javier Jiménez Pérez (incumbent)	New Progressive Party	10,995	72.71	+4.87
Erlando Méndez Morales	Popular Democratic Party	3,602	23.82	–5.59
Evaristo Díaz	Puerto Rican Independence Party	525	3.47	+0.72
Total		15,122	100.00	–
New Progressive Party hold				

Incumbent mayor Javier Jiménez Pérez won his fifth term.

=== Santa Isabel ===
2020 Santa Isabel mayoral election
Candidate	Party	Votes	%	+/–
Rafael Burgos Santiago	Popular Democratic Party	4,836	49.72	+2.74
Enrique Questell (incumbent)	New Progressive Party	4,591	47.20	–4.14
Fermín Candelario	Puerto Rican Independence Party	300	3.08	+1.40
Total		9,727	100.00	–
Popular Democratic Party gain from New Progressive Party				

Incumbent mayor Enrique Questell Alvarado ran for a 5th term, won the PNP primary, but lost to Rafael Burgos Santiago.

=== Toa Alta ===
2020 Toa Alta mayoral election
Candidate	Party	Votes	%	+/–
Clemente Agosto (incumbent)	Popular Democratic Party	10,185	47.12	–4.69
Héctor Collazo Ayala	New Progressive Party	9,235	42.73	–3.21
Pedro Aníbal Díaz	Puerto Rican Independence Party	2,194	10.15	+7.90
Total		21,614	100.00	–
Popular Democratic Party hold				

Héctor Collazo Ayala won the PNP primary. Nonetheless, incumbent mayor Clemente Agosto Lugardo won the PPD primary and his third term.

=== Toa Baja ===
2020 Toa Baja mayoral election
Candidate	Party	Votes	%	+/–
Bernardo Márquez (incumbent)	New Progressive Party	17,557	69.31	–4.86
Luis López Rodríguez	Popular Democratic Party	5,526	21.82	–1.37
Wanda González Vélez	Puerto Rican Independence Party	2,247	8.87	+6.23
Total		25,330	100.00	–
New Progressive Party hold				

Incumbent mayor Bernardo Márquez García won the PNP primary and his second term.

=== Trujillo Alto ===
2020 Trujillo Alto mayoral election
Candidate	Party	Votes	%	+/–
José Cruz Cruz (incumbent)	Popular Democratic Party	11,830	49.67	–13.76
Eric Correa Rivera	New Progressive Party	9,701	40.73	+9.17
Ogé Díaz Nazario	Puerto Rican Independence Party	2,284	9.59	+4.58
Total		23,815	100.00	–
Popular Democratic Party hold				

Incumbent mayor José Cruz Cruz won the PPD primary and his fourth term.

=== Utuado ===
2020 Utuado mayoral election
Candidate	Party	Votes	%	+/–
Jorge Pérez Heredia	New Progressive Party	5,791	49.38	+2.92
Ernesto Irizarry Salvá (incumbent)	Popular Democratic Party	5,375	45.83	–6.61
Marcos Dariel Collazo	Puerto Rican Independence Party	562	4.79	+3.69
Total		11,728	100.00	–
New Progressive Party gain from Popular Democratic Party				

Jorge Pérez Heredia won the PNP primary. Pérez won against incumbent mayor Ernesto Irizarry Salvá.

=== Vega Alta ===
2020 Vega Alta mayoral election
Candidate	Party	Votes	%	+/–
María Vega Pagán	New Progressive Party	5,974	48.32	–0.06
Oscar Santiago (incumbent)	Popular Democratic Party	5,792	46.85	–2.55
Luis Felipe Mercado	Puerto Rican Independence Party	597	4.83	+2.61
Total		12,363	100.00	–
New Progressive Party gain from Popular Democratic Party				

Incumbent mayor Oscar Santiago Martínez ran for a 2nd term, but lost to María Vega Pagán.

=== Vega Baja ===
2020 Vega Baja mayoral election
Candidate	Party	Votes	%	+/–
Marcos Cruz Molina (incumbent)	Popular Democratic Party	12,285	67.38	–0.28
Melvin Carrión Rivera	New Progressive Party	5,212	28.59	–1.90
Luis Rodríguez Rivera	Puerto Rican Independence Party	735	4.03	+2.18
Total		18,232	100.00	–
Popular Democratic Party hold				

Melvin Carrión Rivera won the PNP primary. Nonetheless, incumbent mayor Marcos Cruz Molina won his third term.

=== Vieques ===
2020 Vieques mayoral election
Candidate	Party	Votes	%	+/–
José Corcino Acevedo	New Progressive Party	1,562	51.36	+13.23
Víctor Emeric (incumbent)	Popular Democratic Party	1,348	44.33	–11.79
Amelio Feliciano Santos	Puerto Rican Independence Party	100	3.29	+2.12
Yashei Rosario Centeno	Independent	31	1.02	New
Total		3,041	100.00	–
New Progressive Party gain from Popular Democratic Party				

Incumbent mayor Víctor Emeric Catarineau ran for a 3rd term, but lost to José Corcino Acevedo.

=== Villalba ===
2020 Villalba mayoral election
Candidate	Party	Votes	%	+/–
Luis Hernández Ortiz (incumbent)	Popular Democratic Party	7,927	64.67	+14.12
Guillermo Irizarry Rodríguez	New Progressive Party	4,118	33.59	–14.76
María Díaz Santos	Puerto Rican Independence Party	213	1.74	+0.64
Total		12,258	100.00	–
Popular Democratic Party hold				

Incumbent mayor Luis Hernández Ortiz won his second term.

=== Yabucoa ===
2020 Yabucoa mayoral election
Candidate	Party	Votes	%	+/–
Rafael Surillo Ruiz (incumbent)	Popular Democratic Party	9,613	65.45	+8.46
Ángel García	New Progressive Party	4,725	32.17	–9.69
Lydia Ortiz Flores	Puerto Rican Independence Party	349	2.38	+1.23
Total		14,687	100.00	–
Popular Democratic Party hold				

Incumbent mayor Rafael Surillo Ruiz won his third term.

=== Yauco ===
2020 Yauco mayoral election
Candidate	Party	Votes	%	+/–
Ángel Torres Ortiz (incumbent)	New Progressive Party	9,316	66.15	+5.37
Yadira Ramos Rodríguez	Popular Democratic Party	4,054	28.78	–5.91
María Núñez Naranjo	Puerto Rican Independence Party	714	5.07	+0.54
Total		14,084	100.00	–
New Progressive Party hold				

Incumbent mayor Ángel Torres Ortiz won his second term.
