= José Santiago =

José Santiago may refer to:

- José Santiago (1950s pitcher) (1928–2018), Puerto Rican pitcher in Major League Baseball, 1954–1956
- José Santiago (1960s pitcher) (born 1940), Puerto Rican pitcher in Major League Baseball, 1963–1970
- José Santiago (2000s pitcher) (born 1974), Puerto Rican pitcher in Major League Baseball, 1997–2005
- José Avilés Santiago, Puerto Rican politician; mayor of Moca 2001–2021
- Jose L. Santiago, American politician
- José Luis Santiago Vasconcelos (1957–2008), Mexican civil servant killed in an aviation accident
- José Turiano Santiago (1875–1942?), Filipino patriot in the 1896 Philippine Revolution

== See also ==
- Josian Santiago (born 1957), Puerto Rican mayor of Comerío
