= Miguel Ortiz =

Miguel Ortíz may refer to:

- Miguel Ortiz Vélez, mayor of Sabana Grande, Puerto Rico
- Miguel Ortiz (seaQuest DSV), a character on the TV series seaQuest DSV
- Miguel Ortiz, better known as the professional wrestler Halloween
