= Jose Roman =

Jose Roman may refer to:

- José Roman (boxer) (born 1946), boxer from Puerto Rico
- José Román (baseball) (born 1963), baseball pitcher from the Dominican Republic
- José Román Abreu (born 1975), Puerto Rican politician and mayor of San Lorenzo

== See also ==
- Joe Roman, biologist
