= José Javier Rodríguez =

José Javier Rodríguez may refer to:

- José Javier Rodríguez (Puerto Rican politician)
- José Javier Rodríguez (Florida politician)

== See also ==
- José Rodríguez (disambiguation)
