= Evelyn Delerme =

Puerto Rican politician

Mayor of Vieques
- In office January 14, 2009 – January 13, 2013
- Preceded by: Dámaso Serrano
- Succeeded by: Víctor Emeric

Personal details
- Party: New Progressive Party (PNP)

Evelyn Delerme Camacho is a Puerto Rican politician and former mayor of Vieques. Delerme is affiliated with the New Progressive Party (PNP) and served as mayor from 2009 to 2013.
