= Benjamín Cintrón Lebrón =

Puerto Rican politician (1952–2022)

Mayor of Patillas
- In office January 14, 2001 – January 13, 2013
- Preceded by: Pilar Rodríguez Rivera
- Succeeded by: Norberto Soto Figueroa

Mayor of Patillas
- In office January 14, 1977 – January 14, 1981
- Preceded by: Bernice Colón de Planadeball
- Succeeded by: Jose Juan Latalladi

Personal details
- Born: May 5, 1952 Patillas, Puerto Rico
- Died: May 4, 2022 (Aged 69)
- Party: New Progressive Party (PNP)

Benjamín "Bengie" Cintrón Lebrón was a Puerto Rican politician and former mayor of Patillas. Cintrón was affiliated with the New Progressive Party (PNP) and served as mayor from 2001 to 2013.

In 2011, Cintrón was investigated by the Department of Justice of Puerto Rico for allegedly misusing public funds. The complaints to Justice were presented by members of the Municipal Assembly of Patillas, who felt that Cintrón wasn't allowed to use certain funds to celebrate the patron saint festival. Later that year, the Evaluating Committee of the New Progressive Party disqualified Cintrón from running in the upcoming elections. The committee cited the investigation by Justice, as well as another investigation for sexual harassment, as the reasons to disqualify Cintrón.

Cintrón appealed the decision and was allowed to run in the 2012 primaries. However, he was defeated by Cristóbal Colón Ruiz.

Benjamín Cintrón Lebrón died on May 4, 2022. He was 69 years old.
