= Ricardo López Cepero =

Puerto Rican politician

Mayor of Culebra
- In office December 20, 2011 – January 13, 2013
- Preceded by: Abraham Peña
- Succeeded by: Iván Solís

Personal details
- Party: New Progressive Party (PNP)

Ricardo López Cepero is a Puerto Rican politician and former mayor of Culebra. López is affiliated with the New Progressive Party (PNP) and served as mayor from 2011 to 2013.
