= Luis Alberto Echevarría =

Puerto Rican politician

Luis Alberto "Berty" Echevarría

Mayor of Aguada
- In office January 14, 2005 – January 13, 2013
- Preceded by: Miguelito Ruíz
- Succeeded by: Jessie Cortés Ramos

Personal details
- Party: New Progressive Party (PNP)

Luis Alberto "Berty" Echevarría is a Puerto Rican politician, physician and former mayor of Aguada. Echevarría is affiliated with the New Progressive Party (PNP) and served as mayor from 2005 to 2013.
