= Roberto Hernández Vélez =

Puerto Rican politician

Mayor of Corozal
- In office January 14, 2001 – January 13, 2013
- Preceded by: Carlos Serra Vélez
- Succeeded by: Sergio Torres

Personal details
- Party: New Progressive Party (PNP)

Roberto Hernández Vélez is a Puerto Rican politician and former mayor of Corozal. Hernández is affiliated with the New Progressive Party (PNP) and served as mayor from 2001 to 2013.
