= Maritza Meléndez Nazario =

Puerto Rican politician

Mayor of Naguabo
- In office January 14, 2009 – January 13, 2013
- Preceded by: Wilfredo Astacio
- Succeeded by: Noé Marcano

Personal details
- Born: February 6, 1959 (age 67) Naguabo, Puerto Rico
- Party: New Progressive Party (PNP)
- Education: University of Puerto Rico; University of Turabo (MBA)

Maritza Meléndez Nazario (born February 6, 1959) is a Puerto Rican politician and former mayor of Naguabo. Meléndez is affiliated with the New Progressive Party (PNP) and served as mayor from 2009 to 2013. Has a Bachelor in commercial secretarial education from the University of Puerto Rico and a Masters in administration and supervision from the University of Turabo. He was the first lady of Naguabo when her husband José A. Meléndez was the mayor from 1988 to 2000. Maritza Meléndez Nazario ran for mayor at the 2008 election where she was elected the first woman mayor of Naguabo.
