= Leo Cotte =

Puerto Rican politician (1946–2024)

Mayor of Lajas
- In office January 14, 2009 – January 13, 2013
- Preceded by: Marcos Irizarry Pagán
- Succeeded by: Marcos Irizarry Pagán

Personal details
- Born: October 17, 1946 Lajas, Puerto Rico
- Died: July 18, 2024 (aged 77)
- Party: New Progressive Party (PNP)
- Spouse: Sarah Pérez
- Children: 3
- Education: University of Puerto Rico at Mayagüez (BAgr)

Leovigildo "Leo" Cotte (October 17, 1946 – July 18, 2024) was a Puerto Rican politician and mayor of Lajas. He was affiliated with the New Progressive Party (PNP) and served as mayor from 2009 to 2013.

== Public service ==
Cotte was an agronomist graduated from the University of Puerto Rico at Mayagüez. He dedicated himself to teaching for thirty years. He was employed by the Department of Education. Served as Mayor of Lajas, Puerto Rico from January 14, 2009 until January 13, 2013.
