= Iván Solís =

Puerto Rican politician

Mayor of Culebra
- In office January 20, 2013 – January 20, 2021
- Preceded by: Ricardo López Cepero
- Succeeded by: Edilberto Romero

Personal details
- Born: January 21, 1976 (age 50)
- Party: Popular Democratic Party (PPD)

William Iván Solís Bermúdez is a Puerto Rican politician and the current mayor of Culebra. Romero is affiliated with the Popular Democratic Party (PPD) and has served as mayor since 2021.
