= Norberto Soto Figueroa =

Puerto Rican politician

Mayor of Patillas
- In office January 14, 2013 – January 14, 2021
- Preceded by: Benjamín Cintrón Lebrón
- Succeeded by: Maritza Sánchez Neris

Personal details
- Party: Popular Democratic Party (PPD)

Norberto Soto Figueroa is a Puerto Rican politician and the former mayor of Patillas. Soto is affiliated with the Popular Democratic Party (PPD) and has served as mayor since 2013. He lost to Martiza Sánchez Neris in 2020
