= Eduard Rivera Correa =

Puerto Rican politician (born 1953)

Mayor of Río Grande
- In office January 14, 2005 – September 2, 2014
- Preceded by: Emilio Rosa Pacheco
- Succeeded by: Rafael Ramos Matos (interim)

Personal details
- Born: June 11, 1953 (age 73) Río Grande, Puerto Rico
- Party: Popular Democratic Party (PPD)
- Education: University of Puerto Rico (BBA)

Eduard Rivera Correa (born June 11, 1953) is a Puerto Rican politician and a former mayor of Río Grande. Rivera is affiliated with the Popular Democratic Party (PPD) and has served as mayor since 2005. Earned a bachelor's degree in business administration with a concentration in accounting from the University of Puerto Rico.

On July 10, 2014, Rivera Correa was arrested by the FBI on corruption charges. He was sentenced to serve 64 months in prison and ordered to forfeit $39,000 for soliciting and receiving cash bribes from a contractor. He officially resigned as Mayor on September 2, 2014. His deputy mayor, Rafael Ramos Matos, replaced him provisionally until a special election was held on September 14, 2014. In this election, Angel "Bori" González was elected as Rivera Correa's official replacement.
