= Isabelo Molina =

Puerto Rican politician

Mayor of Vega Alta
- In office January 14, 1993 – January 14, 2001
- Preceded by: José Manuel Colón García
- Succeeded by: Juan Mane Cruzado
- In office January 14, 2005 – January 13, 2017
- Succeeded by: Oscar Santiago

Personal details
- Born: November 11, 1939 (age 86) Vega Alta, Puerto Rico
- Party: New Progressive Party (PNP)
- Education: University of Puerto Rico (B.Ed.)

Isabelo "Chabelo" Molina Hernandez (born November 11, 1939) is a Puerto Rican politician and was the mayor of Vega Alta from 1992 to 2017. Molina is affiliated with the New Progressive Party (PNP) and has served as mayor since 2005. Has a bachelor's degree in secondary education from the University of Puerto Rico.
