= Jessie Cortés Ramos =

Puerto Rican politician (born 1970)

Member of the Puerto Rico House of Representatives from the 18th District
- In office January 2, 2020 – December 31, 2024
- Preceded by: José (Che) Pérez Cordero
- Succeeded by: Odalys González

Mayor of Aguada
- In office January 14, 2013 – January 8, 2017
- Preceded by: Luis Alberto Echevarría
- Succeeded by: Manuel Santiago Mendoza

Personal details
- Born: September 5, 1970 (age 55)
- Party: Popular Democratic Party (PPD)

Jessie Cortés Ramos is a Puerto Rican politician and former mayor of Aguada. Cortés is affiliated with the Popular Democratic Party (PPD) and served as mayor from 2013 to 2017. He is Currently the representative of Puerto Rico's 18th representative district by the Popular Democratic Party. He is one of the vocal voices of the PDP in the West side of the island.

House of Representatives of Puerto Rico
Preceded by José (Che) Pérez Cordero	Member of the Puerto Rico House of Representatives from the 18th District; 2021-2024	Succeeded by Odalys González
Political offices
Preceded by Luis Alberto Echevarría	Mayor of Aguada, Puerto Rico; 2013-2017	Succeeded by Manuel Santiago Mendoza
