= Elliot Colón Blanco =

Puerto Rican politician, mayor of Barranquitas

Mayor of Barranquitas
- Incumbent
- Assumed office November 21, 2019
- Preceded by: Francisco López López

Personal details
- Party: New Progressive Party (PNP)

Elliott Colón Blanco is a Puerto Rican politician who is the mayor of the city of Barranquitas. He is affiliated with the statehood advocating Partido Nuevo Progresista or "PNP" political party of Puerto Rico.

== See also ==
- List of Puerto Ricans
- Politics of Puerto Rico
