= Juan José Rodríguez Pérez =

Puerto Rican politician

Mayor of Ciales
- In office January 14, 2013 – January 2, 2017
- Preceded by: Luis "Rolan" Maldonado
- Succeeded by: Luis "Rolan" Maldonado

Personal details
- Party: Popular Democratic Party (PPD)

Juan José Rodríguez Pérez is a Puerto Rican politician and former mayor of Ciales. Marcano is affiliated with the Popular Democratic Party (PPD) and he served as mayor from 2013 to 2017.
