= Francisco López López =

Puerto Rican politician

Mayor of Barranquitas
- In office January 14, 1997 – November 21, 2019
- Preceded by: José Zayas Green
- Succeeded by: Elliot Colón Blanco

Personal details
- Born: November 5, 1959 (age 66) Barranquitas, Puerto Rico
- Party: New Progressive Party (PNP)
- Spouse: Darlenne Jannette Rivera Figueroa
- Children: Mariceli; Viviana; Francisco José
- Education: Pontifical Catholic University of Puerto Rico (BA, M.Ed)

Francisco "Paco" López López (born November 5, 1959) is a Puerto Rican politician and the current mayor of Barranquitas. López is affiliated with the New Progressive Party (PNP) and has served as mayor since 1997.

== Early years and studies ==
Francisco López López was born in Barrio Quebradillas of Barranquitas on November 5, 1959. He is the fourth son of farmer Abraham López and Benedicta López.

López completed a Bachelor's degree in Arts and Humanities, with a major in Philosophy, from the Pontifical Catholic University of Puerto Rico in Ponce, Puerto Rico. He also studied at the St. Vincent de Paul Regional Seminary in Boynton Beach, Florida. Finally, he received a Master's degree in Education from the Pontifical Catholic University of Puerto Rico.

== Professional career ==
López worked as a Science and Religion teacher at Colegio Valvanera in Coamo, from 1983 to 1985. He also worked as Director until 1986. López later worked as a Professor of Humanities at the Interamerican University of Puerto Rico. He eventually became Department Director.

== Political career ==
López began his political career in 1992 as a voting college official, and later president of his unit. López also served as president of the PNP in Barranquitas.

López ran for Mayor of Barranquitas at the 1996 general election. He won obtaining 50.6% of the votes. After that, López has been reelected four times (2000, 2004, 2008, and 2012).

in 2019 he stepped down to retire as mayor of Barranquitas after 22 years in office.

== Personal life ==
López is married to Darlenne Jannette Rivera Figueroa. They have three children together: Mariceli, Viviana, and Francisco José.
