= Eduardo Cintrón =

Puerto Rican politician

Eduardo Edgardo Cintrón Suarez

Mayor of Guayama
- In office January 14, 2013 – April 8, 2022
- Preceded by: Glorimari Jaime
- Succeeded by: O'Brain Vázquez Molina

Personal details
- Born: October 24, 1967 (age 58) Guayama, Puerto Rico
- Party: Popular Democratic Party (PPD)
- Education: Pontifical Catholic University of Puerto Rico (BBA); University of Turabo (MBA)

Eduardo E. Cintrón Suárez is a Puerto Rican politician and former mayor of Guayama. Cintrón was affiliated with the Popular Democratic Party (PPD).

In 2022, Cintrón-Suárez pleaded guilty to engaging in a bribery scheme in which he received cash payments in exchange for executing municipal contracts and approving invoice payments for an asphalt and paving company. A federal district judge sentenced Eduardo Cintrón to 30 months in prison

== Education ==
Eduardo E. Cintrón Suárez completed his bachelor's degree in business administration at the Pontifical Catholic University of Puerto Rico Guayama campus, and also completed a master's degree in business and administration at the University of Turabo.
