= Roberto Pagán Centeno =

Puerto Rican politician

Mayor of Lares
- In office January 14, 2005 – January 2, 2020
- Preceded by: Luis Oliver Canabal
- Succeeded by: José I. Rodríguez Ruiz

Personal details
- Born: January 11, 1943 (age 82)
- Political party: New Progressive Party (PNP)

Roberto Pagán Centeno (born January 11, 1943) is a Puerto Rican politician and former mayor of Lares. Pagán is affiliated with the New Progressive Party (PNP) and had served as mayor from 2005 to January 2020.
