= Víctor Emeric =

Puerto Rican politician

Was Mayor of Vieques
- In office January 14, 2013 – January 14, 2021
- Preceded by: Evelyn Delerme
- Succeeded by: José A. Corcino Acevedo

Personal details
- Born: May 29, 1952 (age 74) Vieques, Puerto Rico
- Party: Popular Democratic Party (PPD)
- Education: University of Puerto Rico (BA)

Víctor Emeric Catarineau (born May 29, 1952) is a Puerto Rican politician and was the mayor of Vieques. Emeric is affiliated with the Popular Democratic Party (PPD) and has served as mayor from 2013 till January 11, 2021.

ABRE Puerto Rico gave the mayor a D fiscal rating for his administration handling of Vieques during the 2016 fiscal year and ranking it 50th in fiscal health among the municipalities.
