= Noé Marcano =

Puerto Rican politician

Noé Marcano Rivera

Mayor of Naguabo
- In office January 13, 2013 – January 13, 2021
- Preceded by: Maritza Meléndez Nazario
- Succeeded by: Miraidaliz Rosario Pagán

Secretary General of the New Progressive Party
- In office September 15, 2020 – January 2, 2021

Executive Director for the Puerto Rico Automobile Accident Compensation Administration
- In office January 17, 2021 – January 2, 2025
- Governor: Pedro Pierluisi

Personal details
- Born: December 31, 1980 (age 45)
- Party: New Progressive Party (PNP)
- Spouse: Yanis Morales
- Education: Interamerican University of Puerto Rico

Noé Marcano Rivera is a Puerto Rican politician and the current mayor of Naguabo. Marcano is affiliated with the New Progressive Party (PNP) and has served as mayor since 2013. Marcano has a master's degree from the Interamerican University of Puerto Rico. In 2020 New Progressive Party chair Pedro Pierluisi appointed Noe Marcano as Secretary General of the New Progressive Party. Lost the 2020 election to Miraidaliz Rosario Pagán of the Popular Democratic Party. Noe Marcano was appointed in 2021 executive director for the Puerto Rico Automobile Accident Compensation Administration (ACAA) by governor Pedro Pierluisi.
