= Sergio Torres Torres =

Puerto Rican politician

Mayor of Corozal
- In office January 14, 2013 – January 14, 2020
- Preceded by: Roberto Hernández Vélez
- Succeeded by: Luis "Luiggi" García

Personal details
- Party: Popular Democratic Party (PPD)

Sergio Torres Torres is a Puerto Rican politician and the former mayor of Corozal. Torres is affiliated with the Popular Democratic Party (PPD) and served as mayor since 2013 until 2020.

In January 2015, Mayor Torres's daughter was involved in a scandal when naked photos of her were discovered on the internet. It was not clear if the photos of her were taken when she was a minor.

Torres was mayor when Hurricane Maria struck the island in September 2017 destroying the infrastructure of Corozal. Torres decried the slow government response saying he didn't have enough food and water to supply the victims and that people from Corozal were having to get water from rivers or collect rain water. Consumable water was not available to many residents for weeks after the hurricane struck.
