= Gilberto Pérez Valentín =

Puerto Rican politician

Mayor of Maricao
- In office January 14, 1993 – January 14, 2021
- Preceded by: Jesús A. Rodríguez Rodríguez
- Succeeded by: Wilfredo 'Juny' Ruiz

Personal details
- Born: May 11, 1955 (age 71) Maricao, Puerto Rico
- Party: New Progressive Party (PNP)
- Education: Interamerican University of Puerto Rico (BEc)

Gilberto Pérez Valentín is a Puerto Rican politician and the former mayor of Maricao. Pérez is affiliated with the New Progressive Party (PNP). He served from 1993 until 2021. He has a Bachelor in Economics from the Interamerican University of Puerto Rico.

== Tenure ==
After winning the 1992 elections, Pérez has been reelected six times (1996, 2000, 2004, 2008, 2012, and 2016). In 2020 the mayor obtained 46% of the vote and lost to Wilfredo “Juny” Ruiz who obtained 53% of the vote.

During his tenure the mayor was accused of nepotism after unlawfully contracting and maintaining his brother in the municipal government. In February 2020 the mayor denied he was the mayor when asked to identify himself by a blogger. In 2021 the mayor was fined $3‚000 for not reporting income earnings.
