= Isidro A. Negrón Irizarry =

Puerto Rican mayor

Mayor of San Germán
- In office January 2, 2001 – January 10, 2021
- Preceded by: Isaac Llantín Ballester
- Succeeded by: Virgilio Olivera Olivera

Personal details
- Born: December 3, 1956 (age 69) San Germán, Puerto Rico
- Party: Popular Democratic Party (PPD)
- Spouse: Doris Zapata Padilla
- Children: Sheila; Samuel; Nicollemarie; Michael Rafael
- Education: Interamerican University of Puerto Rico (BS); University of Puerto Rico at Mayagüez (MS)
- Occupation: Politician

Isidro A. Negrón Irizarry (born December 3, 1956) is a Puerto Rican politician and former mayor of San Germán, Puerto Rico.

== Early years and studies ==
Isidro Negrón was born on December 3, 1956. He lived for the first 25 years of his life in Las Lomas Housing Project in San Germán, with his mother Maria E. Irizarry. Negrón first attended Julio Víctor Guzmán School and Lola Rodríguez de Tió High School, both in his hometown of San Germán.

He graduated from the Interamerican University of Puerto Rico San Germán campus with a Bachelor of Science in Biology. Afterwards he got his Master of Science in Marine Science from the University of Puerto Rico at Mayagüez. Subsequently he completed his post graduate with a Master of Science in Medical Technology from the School of Medical Technology of the Inter American University of Puerto Rico, graduating Summa Cum Laude in 1985, having obtained the highest grades in the Clinical Practice and Medical Microbiology. He appeared in the Dean's Honor List of the Inter American University of Puerto Rico during all his years of his Bachelor's degree

Negrón is a member of Phi Sigma Alpha fraternity.

== Political career ==
Negrón ran unsuccessfully as a candidate to the Puerto Rico House of Representatives in 1996. In 2000, he ran for the position of mayor of San Germán and won. He was reelected in 2004, 2008, 2012 and 2016.

In 2018, he was accused of fraud and corruption by allegedly working with the Administrative Environmental and Sports Consultants Corp (AESC). He denies the allegations by calling the accusers opportunists.

== Personal life ==
Negrón is married with Doris Zapata Padilla, who is the Director of the Service Center of Special Education for Handicapped Children of the Department of Education of Puerto Rico. They have four children together: Sheila, Samuel, Nicollemarie and Michael Rafael.
