= Jaime Barlucea =

Puerto Rican politician (born 1971)

Jaime Barlucea Maldonado

Mayor of Adjuntas
- In office January 14, 2005 – January 3, 2021
- Preceded by: Roberto Vera Monroig
- Succeeded by: José Hiram Soto Rivera

Member of the Municipal Assembly of Adjuntas, Puerto Rico
- In office 1996–2000

Personal details
- Born: February 14, 1971 (age 55) Ponce, Puerto Rico
- Party: New Progressive Party (PNP)
- Education: Pontifical Catholic University of Puerto Rico (BA)

Jaime H. Barlucea Maldonado (born February 14, 1971) is a Puerto Rican politician and the former mayor of Adjuntas. Barlucea is affiliated with the New Progressive Party (PNP) and served as mayor from 2005 till 2021.

== Early years and studies ==
Jaime H. Barlucea Maldonado was born in Ponce on February 14, 1971. His parents are Jaime Barlucea Ortíz and Rosa María Maldonado Alvarez.

Barlucea completed a Bachelor's degree in Political Science and Public Administration from the Pontifical Catholic University of Puerto Rico.

== Public service ==
Barlucea served as Regional Director of Fomento Cooperativo in Ponce. He also served as Special Aide for the President of the Commission on Public Service, among other positions.

== Political career ==
Barlucea began his political career serving as member of the Municipal Assembly of Adjuntas. In 2004, he ran for mayor of the city, defeating incumbent Roberto Vera Monroig. After that, Barlucea was reelected three times (2008, 2012 and 2016). He won the 2020 PNP primaries, but lost the election to PPD candidate José Soto Rivera.
