= Luis Maldonado (politician) =

Puerto Rican politician

Luis "Rolan" Maldonado

Mayor of Ciales
- In office January 14, 2005 – January 13, 2013
- Preceded by: Angel Otero Pagán
- Succeeded by: Juan José Rodríguez
- In office January 2, 2017 – January 2, 2021
- Preceded by: Juan José Rodríguez

Member of the House of Representatives of Puerto Rico for District 13
- In office January 2, 1993 – January 1, 2005
- Preceded by: Israel Otero Rosario
- Succeeded by: Gabriel Rodríguez Aguiló

Personal details
- Born: June 27, 1954 (age 71) Arecibo, Puerto Rico
- Party: New Progressive Party (PNP)
- Spouse: María Santiago de Jesús (1977-present)
- Children: Luis; Erika

Luis "Rolan" Maldonado Rodríguez (born June 27, 1954) is a Puerto Rican politician and the former mayor of Ciales. Maldonado is affiliated with the New Progressive Party (PNP) and served as mayor from 2005 to 2013 and from 2016 to 2020.

== Early years and studies ==
Luis Maldonado Rodríguez was born in Arecibo, Puerto Rico, on June 27, 1954, to Raúl Maldonado de León and Juanita Rodríguez Espinosa. He is the third of four children.

Maldonado was raised in Barriada Víctor Rojas in Arecibo. He graduated from Antonio Luchetti High School with a vocational curse in woodwork.

== Professional career and public service ==
After graduating from high school, Maldonado began working as an interior designer for five years.

In 1978, Maldonado began working for the Municipality of Arecibo, as Coordinator of Transport and Equipment. After that, he became interim director of the Municipal Hospital, under the administration of then-Mayor José A. Cedeño. He also served as aide of the interim Mayor Rafael Enrique Negrón Tavarez.

In 1984, Maldonado returns to work as interior designer.

== Political career ==
Maldonado entered active politics in 1988, when he was named Treasurer of the Municipal Committee of the New Progressive Party in Ciales, where he had been living since 1982.

In 1991, Maldonado decided to run for the House of Representatives of Puerto Rico representing District 13. He was elected at the 1992 general election. During his first term, Maldonado presided the Commission of Development of the Central Region.

Maldonado was reelected in 1996, after which he presided the Commission of Cooperativism.

Maldonado was elected for a third term at the 2000 general election. He was the District Representative from his party with most votes on that election.

For the 2004 general election, Maldonado decided to run for Mayor of Ciales. He was elected obtaining 51.31% of the votes.

Maldonado was reelected in 2008, obtaining 56.12% of the votes. However, he was defeated by Juan José Rodríguez Pérez (from the PPD) at the 2012 general election. Maldonado's defeat was by only 83 votes. According to an analysis of El Nuevo Día, some of the factors that could've led to Maldonado's defeat were the unemployment and the economic deficit of the city. In the 2016 general election, he won again for the position of mayor. In 2018 he announced he would not seek reelection in the 2020 elections.

== Personal life ==
Maldonado has been married to María Santiago de Jesús since 1977. They have two children together: Luis and Erika.
