= Marcos Irizarry =

Puerto Rican politician

Marcos "Turín" Irizarry

Mayor of Lajas
- In office January 13, 2013 – January 12, 2021
- Preceded by: Leo Cotte
- Succeeded by: Jayson "Jay" Martínez
- In office January 14, 1997 – January 13, 2009
- Preceded by: José Rivera Nazario
- Succeeded by: Leo Cotte

Personal details
- Born: March 17, 1954 (age 72)
- Party: Popular Democratic Party (PPD)

Marcos A. "Turín" Irizarry Pagán (born March 17, 1954) is a Puerto Rican politician and was the mayor of Lajas (1997–2009, 2013–2021). Irizarry is affiliated with the Popular Democratic Party (PPD) and has served as mayor for two separate instances. He first served from 1997 to 2009, and was reelected again in 2013. Marcos Irizarry has an associate degree at the level of master's degree in mathematics at the University of Phoenix holds 30 credits at the level of master's degree in administration and Supervision. Until 1987, Irizarry served as Professor and supervisor of mathematics of the District School of Lajas, while teaching several courses at the Interamerican University of Puerto Rico, San German campus.
