= Walter Torres Maldonado =

Puerto Rican politician

Mayor of Peñuelas
- In office January 14, 1997 – December 31, 2018
- Preceded by: José Cedeño
- Succeeded by: Gregory Gonsález Souchet

Personal details
- Died: December 1, 1963 (age 62)
- Party: Popular Democratic Party (PPD)
- Education: Pontifical Catholic University of Puerto Rico

Walter Torres Maldonado was the mayor of Peñuelas, Puerto Rico since 1997 to 2019.
