= José Javier Rodríguez (Puerto Rican politician) =

Puerto Rican politician

Mayor of Las Marías
- In office January 14, 2013 – January 13, 2017
- Preceded by: Edwin Soto Santiago
- Succeeded by: Edwin Soto Santiago

Personal details
- Party: Popular Democratic Party (PPD)

José Javier Rodríguez is a Puerto Rican politician and the former mayor of Las Marías. Rodríguez is affiliated with the Popular Democratic Party (PPD) and has served as mayor from 2013 to 2017.
