= Aníbal Meléndez Rivera =

Puerto Rican politician, mayor of Fajardo (1948–2021)

Mayor of Fajardo
- In office January 2, 1989 – February 19, 2020
- Preceded by: Alfredo López Cabrera
- Succeeded by: José Anibal Meléndez

Personal details
- Born: February 11, 1948 Naguabo, Puerto Rico
- Died: December 19, 2021 (aged 73) Fajardo, Puerto Rico
- Party: New Progressive Party (PNP)
- Other political affiliations: Republican
- Spouse: Diana Méndez
- Children: Grace; Diana; José Aníbal
- Education: University of Puerto Rico at Humacao (BBA, MBA)
- Occupation: Politician

Aníbal Meléndez Rivera (February 11, 1948 – December 19, 2021) was a Puerto Rican politician who served as mayor of Fajardo from 1989 to 2020.

== Early years and studies ==
Aníbal Meléndez Rivera was born on November 11, 1948, in Naguabo, Puerto Rico. His parents were Luis Meléndez and Angélica Rivera. He grew up in Daguao, a barrio of Naguabo. He graduated from the Rafael Rocca High School of Naguabo.

In 1965, Meléndez enrolled at the University of Puerto Rico at Humacao. He received his bachelor's degree in 1969, and then completed a master's degree in business administration.

== Sports career ==
Since his youth, Meléndez distinguished himself as an athlete, specifically in baseball and track and field. He played Class A and Double AA baseball, the latter with Cataño. In later years, he was involved with the Cariduros de Fajardo team in the Baloncesto Superior Nacional league, serving as sports commentator for 18 years, and also as owner of the team.

== Professional career ==
Meléndez worked as a college professor at the Interamerican University of Puerto Rico Fajardo Campus, with the Business Administration faculty. He also occupied several administrative positions with the Puerto Rico Department of Family Affairs.

== Political career ==
Meléndez was first elected as mayor of Fajardo at the 1988 general elections. After that, he was then reelected on seven consecutive terms (1992, 1996, 2000, 2004, 2008, 2012 and 2016). He was also once the President of the Puerto Rico Mayors Federation. During the 2008 elections, Meléndez received more than 70% of the votes. His margin of victory was the second largest, after Aníbal Vega Borges of Toa Baja.

Aníbal Meléndez Rivera presented his resignation as Mayor of Fajardo after 31 years in office effective February 19, 2020.

== Personal life and death ==
Meléndez met his future wife, Diana Méndez, while in college. They had three children together: Grace, Diana, and José Aníbal. The latter served as Sergeant at Arms of the Puerto Rico House of Representatives until resigning March 2011 due to a positive drug test result.

He suffered from Parkinson's disease. Meléndez died in his home in Fajardo, on December 19, 2021, at the age of 73. He was buried at the Old Fajardo Municipal Cemetery.
