= Rolando Ortiz Velázquez =

Puerto Rican politician

Mayor of Cayey
- Incumbent
- Assumed office January 14, 1997
- Preceded by: Daniel Oquendo Figueroa

Member of the House of Representatives of Puerto Rico from the 29th District
- In office January 2, 1993 – January 1, 1997
- Preceded by: José A. Varela Hernández
- Succeeded by: Luis Aramburu

Member of the Municipal Assembly of Cayey
- In office 1988–1992

Personal details
- Born: April 10, 1960 (age 66) Cayey, Puerto Rico
- Party: Popular Democratic Party (PPD)
- Education: University of Puerto Rico at Cayey (BBA); University of Turabo (BA); Interamerican University of Puerto Rico School of Law (JD)

Rolando Ortiz Velázquez is a Puerto Rican politician and the current mayor of Cayey. Ortiz is affiliated with the Popular Democratic Party (PPD) and has served as mayor since 1997.

He graduated from the Benjamin Harrison School in Cayey, then obtained a bachelor's degree in Business Administration at the University of Puerto Rico at Cayey. He also counts with a BA in criminology from the University of Turabo, graduating with a Magna Cum Laude. He also counts with a juris doctor from the Interamerican University of Puerto Rico School of Law.

Before being elected mayor, Ortiz served President of the Municipal Legislature of Cayey from 1988 to 1992 and later as member of the House of Representatives of Puerto Rico from 1993 to 1997. He represented District 29.

At the 2012 general election, Ortiz received 73.29% of the votes. This was the largest margin of victory for any mayor in that election, which led a newspaper to label him as one of the "most powerful" mayors in the island.

House of Representatives of Puerto Rico
Preceded by José A. Varela Hernández	Member of the Puerto Rico House of Representatives from the 29th District; 1993-1997	Succeeded by Luis Aramburu
Preceded by Carlos J. López Nieves	Minority Whip of the Puerto Rico House of Representatives; 1993–1994	Succeeded by Severo E. Colberg Toro
Political offices
Preceded by Daniel Oquendo Figueroa	Mayor of Cayey, Puerto Rico; 1997-Present	Incumbent
