= Edwin Soto Santiago =

Puerto Rican politician

Mayor of Las Marías
- Incumbent
- Assumed office January 13, 2017
- Preceded by: José Javier Rodríguez
- In office January 14, 1997 – January 13, 2013
- Preceded by: Adrián Heriberto Acevedo
- Succeeded by: José Javier Rodríguez

Personal details
- Born: May 13, 1954 (age 72) Las Marías, Puerto Rico
- Party: New Progressive Party (PNP)
- Spouse: Sylvia Gutiérrez Vélez (1977-present)
- Children: Karen Marie; Edwin Joel
- Education: University of Puerto Rico at Mayagüez

Edwin Soto Santiago (born May 13, 1954) is a Puerto Rican politician who had served as the mayor of Las Marías since 2017, having held this position previously from 1997 until 2013. Soto is affiliated with the New Progressive Party (PNP).

== Early years and studies ==
Edwin Soto Santiago was born in Barrio Maravilla of Las Marías on May 13, 1954. His parents are Germán Soto and Zoraida Santiago.

Soto completed his elementary and high school studies in his hometown, graduating in 1971. He then enrolled at the University of Puerto Rico at Mayagüez to obtain a degree in Agronomy.

== Professional career ==
Soto began working at San Jorge Financial, and eventually became manager. He later worked as Area Supervisor for the firm.

== Political career ==
Soto was first elected as Mayor of Las Marías at the 1996 general election. After that, he was elected three times (2000, 2004, and 2008).

After 16 years as mayor, Soto was defeated at the 2012 general election by José Javier Rodríguez (from the Popular Democratic Party).

== Personal life ==
Soto married Sylvia Gutiérrez Vélez on February 20, 1977. They have two children together: Karen Marie and Edwin Joel.
