= José A. Rodríguez Cruz =

Puerto Rican politician (1961–2024)

José "Chely" Rodríguez

Mayor of Hatillo
- In office January 14, 2005 – April 1, 2022
- Preceded by: Juan Luis Cuevas Castro

Personal details
- Born: 7 October 1961
- Died: 21 January 2024 (aged 62)
- Party: Popular Democratic Party (PPD)
- Education: Interamerican University of Puerto Rico at Arecibo

José A. "Chely" Rodríguez Cruz (7 October 1961 – 21 January 2024) was a Puerto Rican politician who was the mayor of Hatillo. Rodríguez Cruz was affiliated with the Popular Democratic Party (PPD). He earned a bachelor's degree from the Interamerican University of Puerto Rico Arecibo Campus. José “Chely” Rodríguez Cruz joined the municipal administration under the leadership of former mayor Francisco “Pancho” Deida, who appointed him to the municipal Human Resources Office. He served as mayor of Hatillo since 2005 until his resignation in 2022 due to health problems.

Rodríguez Cruz died from kidney failure on 21 January 2024 at the age of 62. He was buried at the New Hatillo Municipal Cemetery in Hatillo.
