= Pedro García Figueroa =

Puerto Rican politician (born 1959)

Mayor of Hormigueros
- Incumbent
- Assumed office January 14, 2005
- Preceded by: Francisco Javier Rivera

Personal details
- Born: February 22, 1959 (age 67)
- Party: Popular Democratic Party (PPD)
- Education: New York University (MS)

Pedro Juan García Figueroa is a Puerto Rican politician and the current mayor of Hormigueros. García is affiliated with the Popular Democratic Party (PPD) and has served as mayor since 2005. He has a master's degree in science for physical education from the New York University.
