= Jorge L. Márquez Pérez =

Puerto Rican politician

Mayor of Maunabo
- In office January 14, 2001 – January 14, 2021
- Preceded by: Erasto Fernández
- Succeeded by: Ángel Omar Lafuente

Personal details
- Born: April 13, 1960 (age 66)
- Party: Popular Democratic Party (PPD)
- Education: University of Puerto Rico at Humacao (BA)

Jorge Luis Márquez Pérez (born April 13, 1960) is a Puerto Rican politician and the former mayor of Maunabo. Márquez is affiliated with the Popular Democratic Party (PPD) and served as mayor from 2001 to 2021. He has a bachelor's degree in chemistry from the University of Puerto Rico at Humacao.
