= Jorge Estévez Martínez =

Puerto Rican politician

Mayor of Añasco
- In office January 14, 2009 – January 14, 2021
- Preceded by: Pablo Crespo Torres
- Succeeded by: Kabir Solares

Personal details
- Born: November 26, 1963
- Died: June 27, 2025 (aged 61)
- Party: Popular Democratic Party (PPD)
- Education: Pontifical Catholic University of Puerto Rico (BCom)

Jorge Estévez Martínez was a Puerto Rican politician and the former mayor of Añasco. Estévez was affiliated with the Popular Democratic Party (PPD) who served as mayor from 2009 to 2021.

== Tenure ==
Jorge Estevez who earned a bachelor's degree in Commerce with concentration in Marketing from the Pontifical Catholic University of Puerto Rico, was mayor of Añasco for three terms. He won the 2016 election with 53% of the vote against Pablo Crespo, the PNP candidate, who won 44% of the vote. In 2020 he was defeated by the PNP candidate Kabir Solares who obtained 54% of the vote while Jorge Estevez obtained 39%.

During his tenure the mayor's most recognized projects are the remodeling of the town square and the market Square. His administration also created the town's convention Center and a community Center in Dagüey.

In 2019 Osvaldo Tubens a former candidate for mayor alleged the municipalities parks were not well maintained. In 2021 an investigation revealed that the municipal government had left multiple vehicles with simple issues rusting away resulting in a loss for the town. The incoming mayor also indicated that the municipal water park was abandoned with horses grazing on the public land nearby.
