= Manuel Santiago Mendoza =

Puerto Rican politician

Mayor of Aguada
- In office January 9, 2017 – January 9, 2021
- Preceded by: Jessie Cortés Ramos
- Succeeded by: Christian Cortes

Personal details
- Party: New Progressive Party (PNP)

Manuel "Gabina" Santiago Mendoza is a Puerto Rican politician and former mayor of Aguada. Santiago is affiliated with the New Progressive Party (PNP) and has served as mayor since 2017.
