= Enrique Questell =

Puerto Rican politician

Enrique "Quique" Questell

Mayor of Santa Isabel
- In office January 14, 2005 – January 14, 2021
- Preceded by: Angel Sánchez Bermúdez

Personal details
- Born: March 26, 1955 (age 71) Santa Isabel, Puerto Rico
- Party: New Progressive Party (PNP)
- Education: Ponce Institute of Technology (AS)

Enrique "Quique" Questell Alvarado (born March 26, 1955) is a Puerto Rican politician and the former mayor of Santa Isabel. Questell is affiliated with the New Progressive Party (PNP) and served as mayor from 2005 until 2020. Has an associate degree in civil engineering from the Ponce Institute of Technology.

== Tenure ==
In 2016 the Puerto Rico Department of Natural and Environmental Resources filed a lawsuit against the mayor for constructing docks without permits. In the aftermath of Hurricane Maria a private company without a contract sued the municipality arguing it assisted with aid but this case was dismissed. During his term the mayor closed off access to the town docks due to safety concerns a move the municipal legislature later opposed.
