= José Román Abreu =

Puerto Rican politician

Mayor of San Lorenzo
- In office January 2, 2001 – January 2, 2021
- Succeeded by: Jaime Alverio Ramos

Personal details
- Born: November 30, 1975 (age 50)
- Party: Popular Democratic Party (PPD)

José R. "Joe" Román Abreu (born November 30, 1975) is a Puerto Rican politician and the former mayor of San Lorenzo. Román is affiliated with the Popular Democratic Party (PPD) and has served as mayor from 2001 until 2021. He also served as president of the Puerto Rico Mayors Association from 2019 to 2021.

In late May 2020, Román Abreu announced he had cancer and would undergo surgery.
