= Miguel Ortiz Vélez =

Puerto Rican politician

Mayor of Sabana Grande
- In office January 14, 1993 – July 7, 2018
- Incumbent
- Assumed office July 7, 2018
- Preceded by: Noel Matías Norelli
- Succeeded by: Noel Matías Norelli

Personal details
- Born: November 5, 1957 (age 69)
- Party: Popular Democratic Party (PPD)

Miguel Gabriel "Papín" Ortiz Veléz is a Puerto Rican politician, who served as mayor of Sabana Grande, from 1993 to 2018. Ortiz was affiliated with the Popular Democratic Party (PPD).

In 2018, U.S. Federal authorities accused Veléz of defrauding the government of millions of dollars in a scheme that lasted from 2013 to 2016.
