= José Avilés Santiago =

Puerto Rican politician

Mayor of Moca
- In office January 14, 2001 – January 11, 2021
- Preceded by: Eustaquio Vélez
- Succeeded by: Ángel “Beto” Pérez Rodríguez

Personal details
- Party: New Progressive Party (PNP)

José Enrique "Kiko" Avilés Santiago is a Puerto Rican politician and past mayor of Moca. Avilés is affiliated with the New Progressive Party (PNP) and has served as mayor since 2001.
