= Josian Santiago =

Puerto Rican politician (born 1957)

Member of the Puerto Rico Senate from the at-large district
- Incumbent
- Assumed office January 2, 2025

Mayor of Comerío
- In office January 8, 2001 – January 8, 2025
- Preceded by: Luis A. Rivera Rivera
- Succeeded by: Irvin Rivera

Personal details
- Born: José Antonio Santiago Rivera; August 27, 1957 (age 69) Comerío, Puerto Rico
- Party: Popular Democratic Party (PPD)
- Other political affiliations: Democratic
- Spouse: Ramona Nieves
- Children: José Juan Santiago Nieves; Jozy Santiago Nieves; Juan José Santiago Nieves; Monica Santiago Nieves
- Education: University of Puerto Rico (BBA)
- Occupation: Mayor; President of the AAPR (PPD)
- Profession: Accountant; Politician

José Antonio "Josian" Santiago Rivera (born August 27, 1957) is a Puerto Rican politician. He became the mayor of the municipality of Comerío as a member of the Popular Democratic Party (PPD) at the 2000 general elections, and was re-elected in 2004 and 2008. In 2010 Santiago became the president of the Asociación de Alcaldes de Puerto Rico, the organization that regulates cooperation between most mayors affiliated to the PPD.

== Early life, education and beliefs ==
Santiago was born in Comerío to José Santiago Berrior and Angélica Rivera and is one of six siblings, along with three sisters, Myrna, Marisol and Nitza, and two brothers, Javier and Fernando. It was here where he completed his primary education, beginning at Escuela Elemental El Salto, completing the sixth grade at Escuela Horace M. Towner and receiving his high school diploma from Escuela Superior Juana Colón. During his youth, he was also a student at the Centro Residencial de Oportunidades Educativas de Mayagüez, a residential center that offers individualized education. Santiago then enrolled in the University of Puerto Rico's main campus, located in Río Piedras, the largest subdivision of San Juan, Puerto Rico. He completed his bachelor's degree in Business Administration and after received his diploma, went on to become a certified public accountant. Santiago is married to Ramona Nieves and is the father of four children, Juan José, Monica, José Juan and Jozy Santiago Nieves. He is a devout practitioner of the Roman Catholic religion and led the Juventud Acción Católica, a youth religious organization. In 1979, Santiago became involved in public service, administrating the management of external funds for the municipality under mayor Gumersindo Carmona. He was subsequently promoted to the rank of Municipal Secretary, serving under mayor Pablo Centeno throughout the 1980s. In 1993, Santiago was recruited to work as assistant for José Aponte de la Torre, mayor of Carolina, Puerto Rico. He is a prominent leader of the soberanistas, the faction within the party that pursues the elimination of the territorial clause by reclaiming Puerto Rico's sovereignty, while entering the ELA Soberano, a document of association with the United States that safeguards existing arrangements including common coin, education grants and citizenship. Within the PPD, the soberanistas serve as polar opposites to the conservadores, the faction that supports remaining a territory.

== Electoral performance and offices held ==
Santiago emerged the political scenario prior to the 2000 general elections, running for the mayorship of his native Comerío representing the Partido Popular Democratico. He won this bid with 6,232 votes or 50%, defeating his opponents, the incumbent Luis Rivera Rivera (Partido Nuevo Progresista; 5,832 or 46.8%) and Carlos Colón Márquez (Partido Independentista Puertorriqueño; 297 or 2.4%). Comerío's general political base supported the PNP's candidate for governor in these elections, but Santiago attracted enough new voters for the PPD base to grow in 13% during the first years of his administration. This was combined with a 3% reduction in the PNP affiliates that voted for that party's candidate for mayor, an estimated 2% voted for the PPD in this ballot. During this term, he also represented the mayors in the administrative structure of the Programa de Comunidades Especiales, a government program that aimed to reduce the poverty rate.

On November 6, 2004, Santiago was elected for a second term (6,276 votes or 50.51%) defeating challengers Miguel Rivera Jr. (PNP; 5,887 or 47.38%) and Aida Luz Cruz Bermúdez (PIP; 204 or 1.64%). In these general elections, the PNP was once again favored in the governor ballot, but the PPD was supported by voters from both parties in the mayorship ballot. He won a third consecutive time at the 2008 general election by receiving 6,962 votes or 56.3%, defeating Randy Reyes Pimentel (PNP; 5,158 or 41.7%) and Luis Rivera Márquez (PIP; 174 or 1.4%). This represented an improvement of 11% when compared to 2004.

On March 12, 2010, Santiago assumed the interim presidency of the Asociación de Alcaldes de Puerto Rico (AAPR), vacated by soberanista leader William Miranda Marín, who was suffering from pancreatic cancer. He was subsequently supported by his peers to take charge of the office officially, being sworn in by Miranda Marín himself. His staff was completed by Pedro García, mayor of Hormigueros, Puerto Rico, as first vice president; Jorge Márquez, mayor of Maunabo, Puerto Rico, as second vice president and Heriberto Vélez, mayor of Quebradillas, Puerto Rico as secretary. He had already served as secretary for the organization and was the acting vice president. He is the official representative of the mayors at the party's committee, the Junta de Gobierno del PPD.

Under Santiago's presidency, the AAPR launched a heavily pro-Puerto Rican campaign, on occasion crossing political lines to support a certain cause. One of these instances was joining several multi-sectorial protests against Via Verde, an oleoduct that may damage the natural resources of Puerto Rico's karst region. He also led an activity for the entity in Comerío, where he was joined by other prominent figures such as Luis Gutiérrez, to support the release of the last Puerto Rican political prisoner, Oscar López. The AAPR also engaged in regular practices. Santiago personally opposed the revocation of a legal agreement reached between all of the municipalities and the Autoridad de Energia Electrica (AEE), which would endanger the availability of the electrical grid to smaller towns. The entity also reclaimed a direct line to guarantee education funds.

As spokesman, Santiago was also responsible for denouncing disparity in the assignment of funds between PPD and PNP municipalities. The AAPR boycotted official activities under the PNP administration to express their contempt at these actions. Santiago directly opposed his antithesis of the PNP's Federación de Alcaldes de Puerto Rico (FAPR), Héctor O'Neill, most notably when a large scale fraud took place in Guaynabo's District 6 primary, which was schemed from within the municipality's government structure.

== Accomplishments and recognition ==
Santiago is responsible for improving the status of Comerío to that of autonomous municipality, gaining fiscal liberty from the central government. This resulted in an investment approaching fifty thousand dollars. The performance of the municipality's finances earned it an "A" grade from the Controllership office, the entity responsible for the fiscalization of public institutions. He is a supporter of Puerto Rican culture, organizing several activities to promote it at the Casa de la Cultura Cacique Comerío, a municipal atrium. He also hosts a competition between performers of trova, a traditional Puerto Rican music, at the town's commemoration of its jíbaro heritage, the Festival Jíbaro Comerieño.

Santiago established an environment-protection program, assigning seven percent of Comerío's terrain for conservation in order to protect the Puerto Rican plain pigeon, an endangered bird species. An extension of this initiative was the production of biodiesel to run a citywide trolley array. The municipality also ranks first in Puerto Rico when ranking the performance of its recycling program. Following the application of the Fiscal Emergency Act (Law No.7) by governor Luis Fortuño, the municipality of Comerío suffered numerous cuts in personnel and services, which made the unemployment rate soar and prompted constant confrontation between the municipality and the central government. Upon taking office, the Fortuño administration went on to close the offices of Retirement Affairs, Electrical Energy Authority, Environmental and Health Affairs, the Superintendent of Schools, Agriculture Extension Initiative, the Center for Agricultural Affairs and a Head Start program. Santiago applied countermeasures, attempting to save the Industrial Cooperative by pursuing an alliance with the Puerto Rico Police Department which would make the official manufacturer of uniforms for the force. He arranged support from the Puerto Rico Department of Education and supported a vocation school, before also establishing an agreement with a private university in order to provide cheap nocturnal education for the unemployed inhabitants.

Santiago spearheaded the construction of Hotel Media Luna, a hotel that he expects will help by offering employment. He is responsible for the establishment of the Biblioteca y Centro Cíbernetico Laura Arroyo Torrens, a cyber-library that offers online-classes supported by the Interamerican University of Puerto Rico. Under his incumbency, Comerío became the first municipality of the central-mountainous region to offer gratituous Wi-Fi connection in its recreation plaza and to receive a hardware upgrade allowing faster rates. After the municipality failed to receive funds from the central administration for road repairs, he secured external funds and attended a public bid to obtain additional vehicles to ensure maintenance.

The municipal administration support the local AA Baseball franchise, the Pescadores del Plata de Comerío, which won the national championship in 2003. Santiago ordered the building of a new municipal auditorium, which has hosted youth volleyball and basketball tournaments promoted by the municipality. Santiago also began an initiative to promote sports and combat childhood obesity, Jugando por tu Salud. He has also hosted a 10-kilometre marathon, the Maratón El Seco.

WAPA-TV's news program, Noticentro, granted Santiago's performance as mayor a "A" grade in Radiografía 2012. This was an investigative series that ranked the administration of the municipalities by performance, taking under consideration the maintenance of the infrastructure, cleanliness, economic state and citizen satisfaction, leading to the 2012 general elections. The CROEM recognized his work as a public employee during the celebration of the center's 42nd anniversary. Santiago's recycling program has been recognized by the Environmental Protection Agency with the "Environmental Quality Award", besting other members of its administrative region including New York, New Jersey and the United States Virgin Islands. The cleanliness of Comerío under his incumbency has received recognitions from the governments of Puerto Rico and the state of New York. On May 26, 2012, a small local professional wrestling promotion, the Champion Wrestling Association, held the 1era Copa Alcalde José A. Santiago, a tournament in his honor to commemorate the fourth anniversary of its foundation.
