= Puerto Rico Highway 180 =

Highway in Puerto Rico

Highway 180
- Ruta 180
- Avenida Pedro Albizu Campos

Route information
- Maintained by Puerto Rico DTPW
- Length: 2.8 km (1.7 mi)

Major junctions
- South end: PR-701 in Río Jueyes
- PR-3 in Aguirre
- North end: PR-1 / PR-52 in Salinas barrio-pueblo

Location
- Country: United States
- Territory: Puerto Rico
- Municipalities: Salinas

Highway system
- Roads in Puerto Rico; List
← PR-179	→ PR-181

Puerto Rico Highway 180 (PR-180) is a bypass located near downtown Salinas, Puerto Rico. This road extends from PR-1 (north of downtown), near PR-52, to PR-701 (south of downtown) and is known as Avenida Pedro Albizu Campos.

== Major intersections ==
The entire route is located in Salinas.

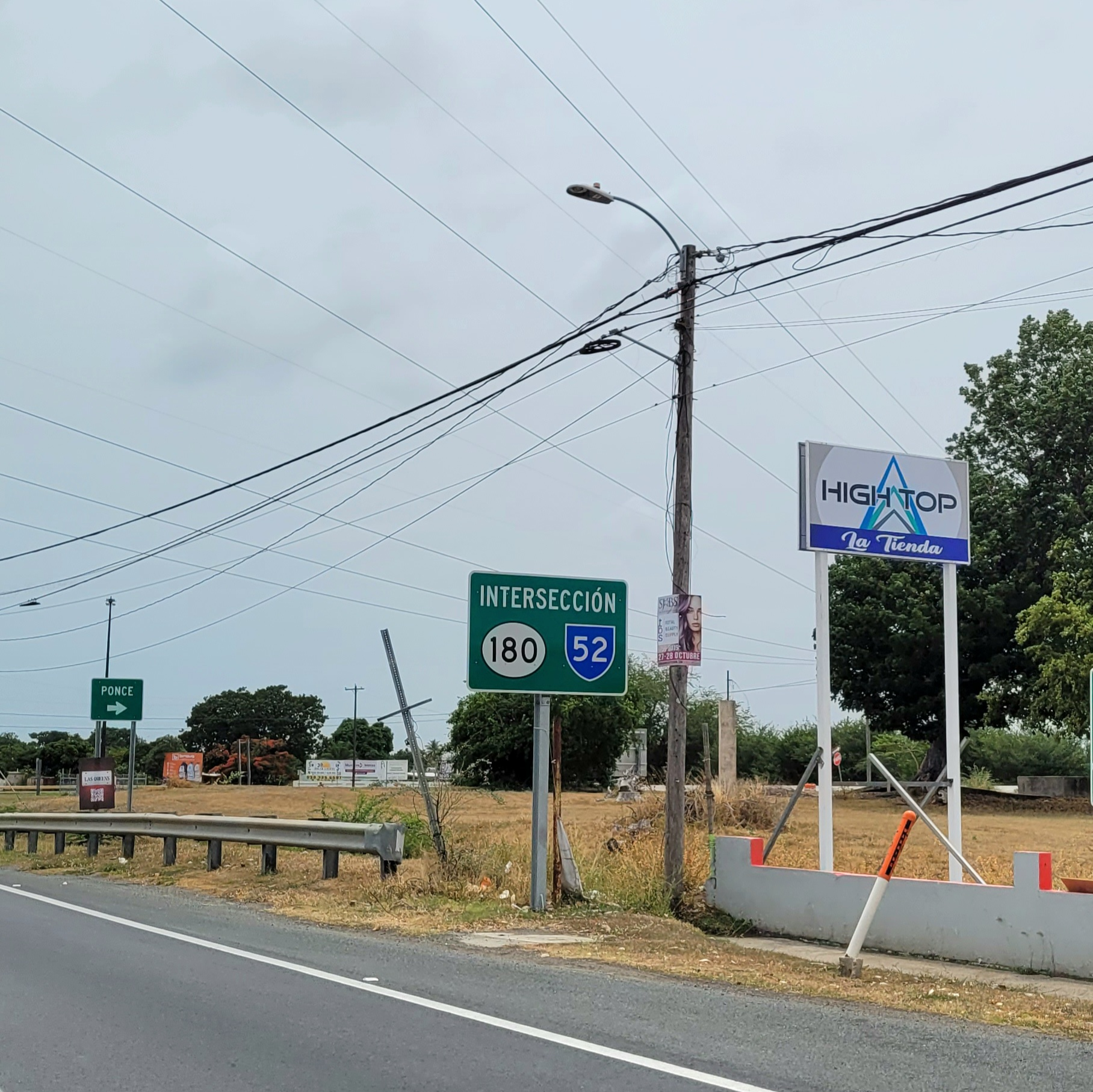
PR-1 south approaching PR-52 and PR-180 intersection near downtown Salinas

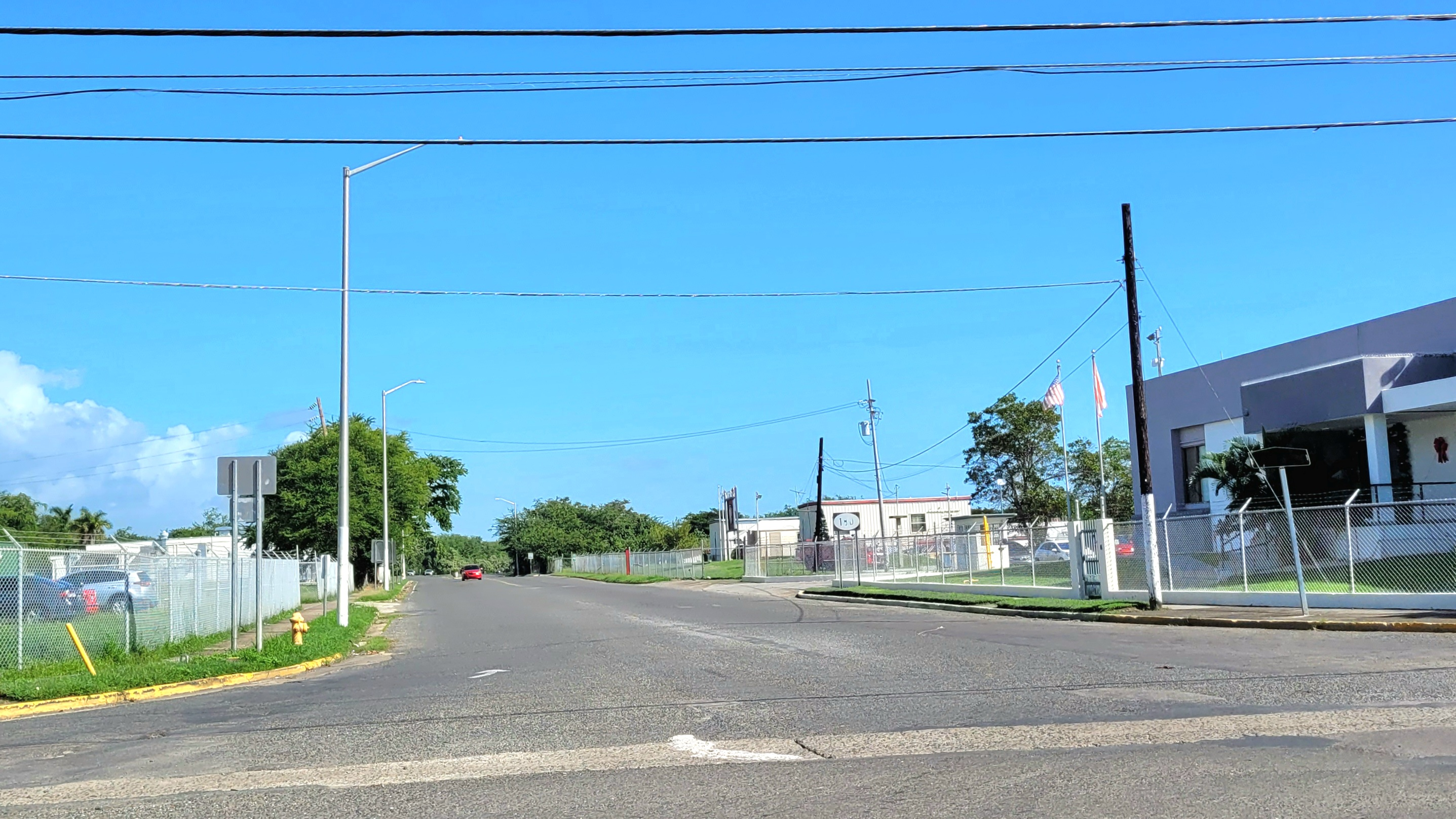
Southern terminus of PR-180 at PR-701 intersection in Río Jueyes

Location	km	mi	Destinations	Notes
Río Jueyes	2.8	1.7	PR-701 – Salinas Playa, Santa Isabel	Southern terminus of PR-180
Aguirre	1.3	0.81	PR-3 – Salinas, Guayama	
Salinas barrio-pueblo	0.0	0.0	PR-1 / PR-52 – Salinas, Cayey, Ponce, San Juan	Northern terminus of PR-180; PR-52 (unsigned PRI-1) exit 65
1.000 mi = 1.609 km; 1.000 km = 0.621 mi

== See also ==
- Pedro Albizu Campos
