= Lapa, Salinas, Puerto Rico =

Barrio of Puerto Rico

Lapa
- Barrio
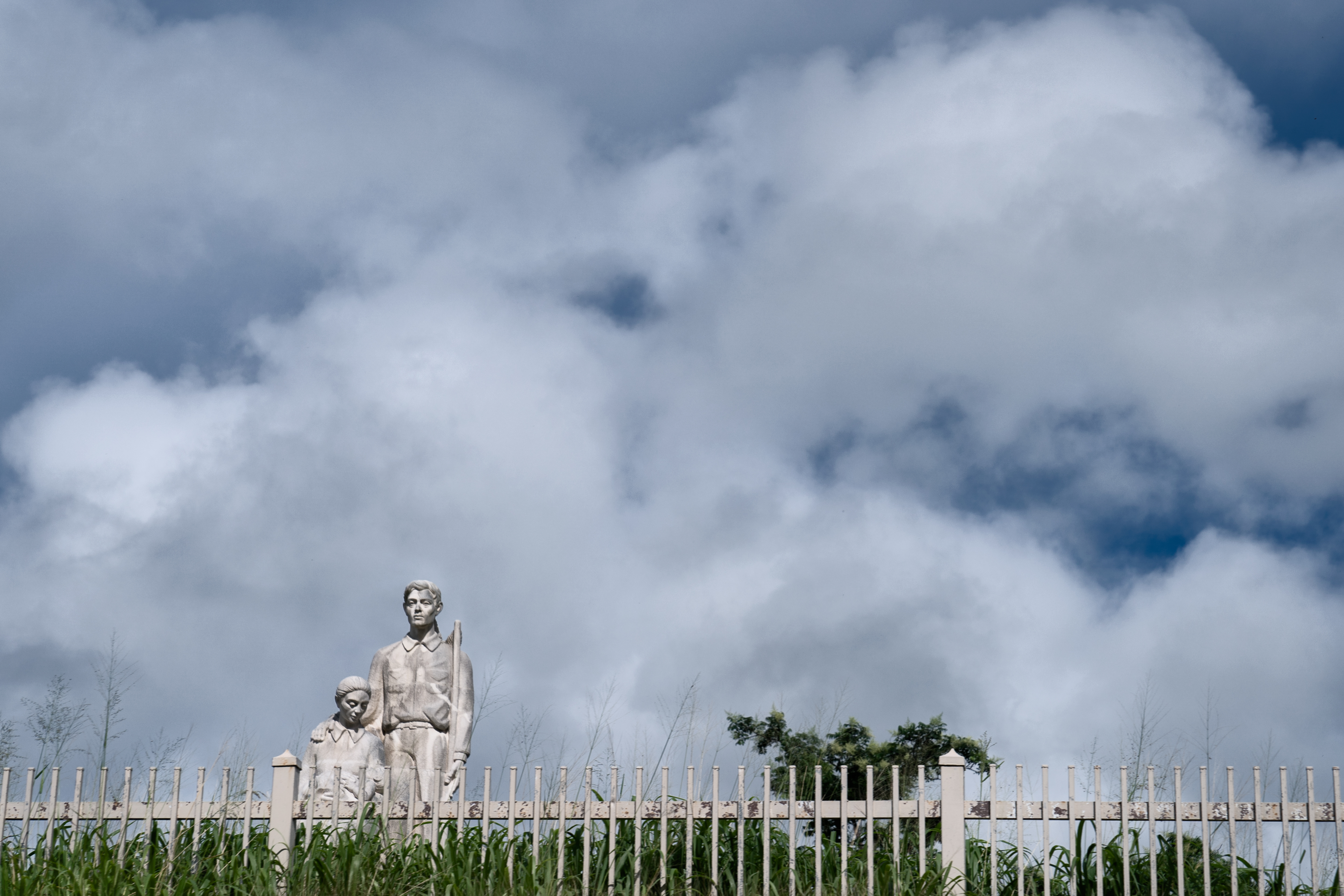
- Monumento al Jíbaro Puertorriqueño is in Lapa

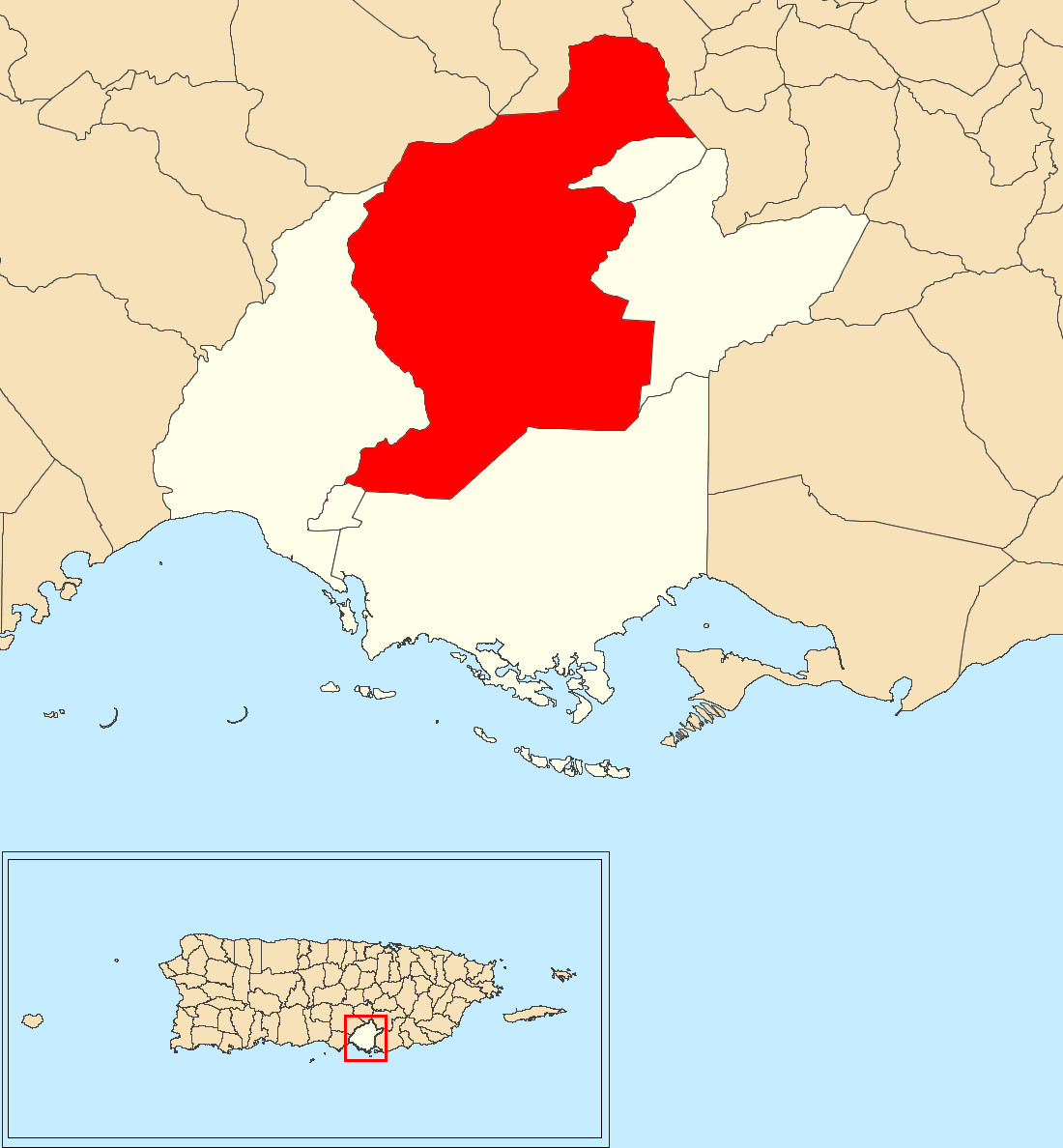
- Location of Lapa within the municipality of Salinas shown in red

- Location of Puerto Rico
- Coordinates: 18°02′29″N 66°15′21″W
- Commonwealth: Puerto Rico
- Municipality: Salinas

Area
  - Total: 24.75 sq mi (64.1 km^{2})
  - Land: 24.74 sq mi (64.1 km^{2})
  - Water: 0.01 sq mi (0.026 km^{2})
- Elevation: 377 ft (115 m)

Population (2010)
  - Total: 9,419
  - Density: 380.6/sq mi (147.0/km^{2})
- Source: 2010 Census
- Time zone: UTC−4 (AST)

Lapa is a barrio in the municipality of Salinas, Puerto Rico. Its population in 2010 was 9,419. Among its attractions is the Monumento al Jíbaro Puertorriqueño, located on Highway 52, km 49.0.

== History ==
Lapa was in Spain's gazetteers until Puerto Rico was ceded by Spain in the aftermath of the Spanish–American War under the terms of the Treaty of Paris of 1898 and became an unincorporated territory of the United States. In 1899, the United States Department of War conducted a census of Puerto Rico finding that the population of Lapa barrio was 1,019.

Historical population
Census	Pop.	Note	%±
1900	1,019		—
1910	2,732		168.1%
1920	2,762		1.1%
1930	2,628		−4.9%
1940	3,822		45.4%
1950	4,621		20.9%
1960	6,078		31.5%
1970	5,848		−3.8%
1980	7,222		23.5%
1990	7,773		7.6%
2000	9,697		24.8%
2010	9,419		−2.9%
U.S. Decennial Census; 1899 (shown as 1900) 1910-1930; 1930-1950 1980-2000 2010

== See also ==
- List of communities in Puerto Rico
