= Carlos Rodríguez Mateo =

Puerto Rican politician (born 1965)

Member of the Puerto Rico Senate from the Guayama district
- In office January 2, 2017 – January 2, 2021

Mayor of Salinas
- In office January 14, 2005 – January 13, 2013
- Preceded by: Abraham López
- Succeeded by: Karilyn Bonilla

Personal details
- Born: July 25, 1965 (age 61) Salinas, Puerto Rico
- Party: New Progressive Party (PNP)
- Education: University of Puerto Rico (BS); Pontificia Universidad Católica Madre y Maestra (MD); University of Puerto Rico School of Medicine (MPH)

Carlos Rodríguez Mateo (born July 25, 1965) is a Puerto Rican politician, former mayor of Salinas and former senator. Rodríguez is affiliated with the New Progressive Party (PNP) and served as mayor from 2005 to 2013. Started his college career University of Puerto Rico, Río Piedras Campus. In 1984, obtained a bachelor's degree in natural sciences with a concentration in biology. Four years later culminated his doctorate in medicine from Pontificia Universidad Católica Madre y Maestra (PUCMM) in the Dominican Republic. In 1993, he completed a master's degree in public health in the area of medical sciences at the University of Puerto Rico School of Medicine.

He was mayor of the municipality of Salinas from 2005 to 2013, and was elected as a Senator in 2016. During this term he served as the president of the Government Commission.
