= Quebrada Yeguas =

Barrio of Salinas, Puerto Rico

- Barrio
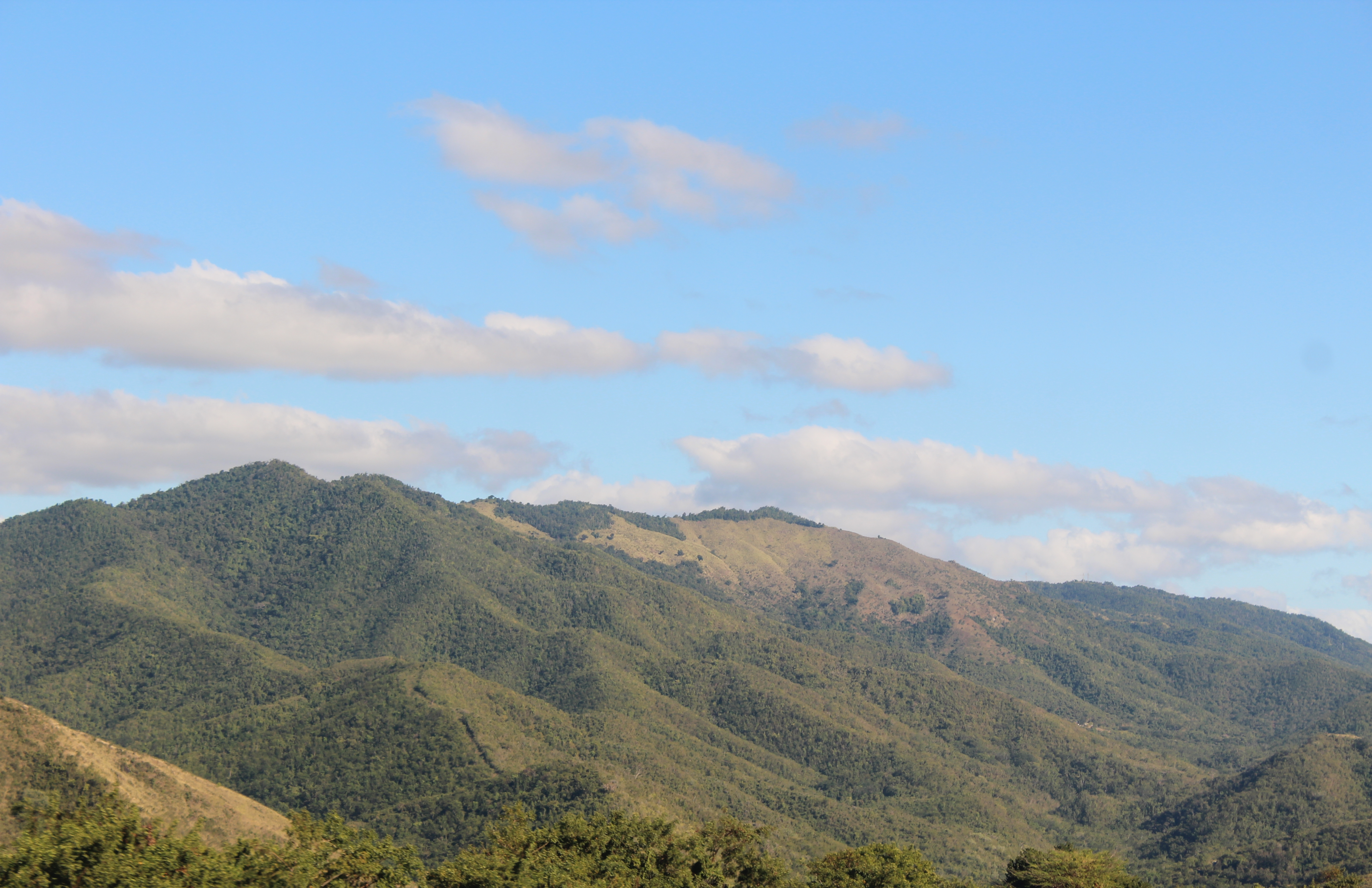

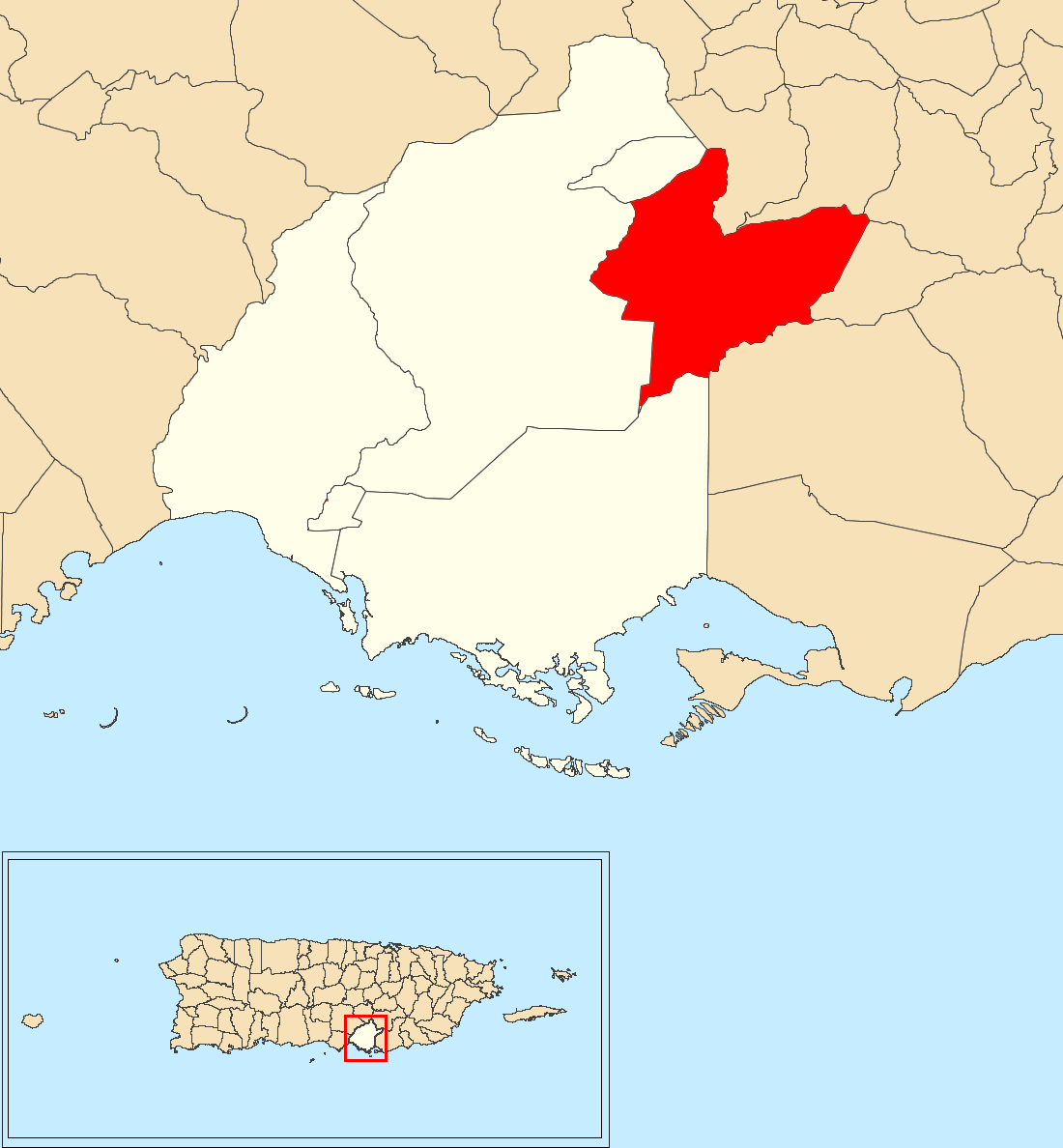
- Location of Quebrada Yeguas within the municipality of Salinas shown in red

- Location of Puerto Rico
- Coordinates: 18°02′04″N 66°11′45″W
- Commonwealth: Puerto Rico
- Municipality: Salinas

Area
  - Total: 8.93 sq mi (23.1 km^{2})
  - Land: 8.92 sq mi (23.1 km^{2})
  - Water: 0.01 sq mi (0.026 km^{2})
- Elevation: 617 ft (188 m)

Population (2010)
  - Total: 1,528
  - Density: 171.3/sq mi (66.1/km^{2})
- Source: 2010 Census
- Time zone: UTC−4 (AST)

Quebrada Yeguas is a barrio in the municipality of Salinas, Puerto Rico. Its population in 2010 was 1,528.

== History ==
Quebrada Yeguas was in Spain's gazetteers until Puerto Rico was ceded by Spain in the aftermath of the Spanish–American War under the terms of the Treaty of Paris of 1898 and became an unincorporated territory of the United States. In 1899, the United States Department of War conducted a census of Puerto Rico finding that the combined population of Palmas and Quebrada Yeguas barrios was 981.

Historical population
Census	Pop.	Note	%±
1910	623		—
1920	525		−15.7%
1930	494		−5.9%
1940	540		9.3%
1950	528		−2.2%
1960	833		57.8%
1970	1,172		40.7%
1980	1,402		19.6%
1990	1,477		5.3%
2000	1,596		8.1%
2010	1,528		−4.3%
U.S. Decennial Census; 1900 (N/A) 1910-1930; 1930-1950 1980-2000 2010

== See also ==
- List of communities in Puerto Rico
