= Palmas, Salinas, Puerto Rico =

Barrio of Puerto Rico

Palmas
- Barrio
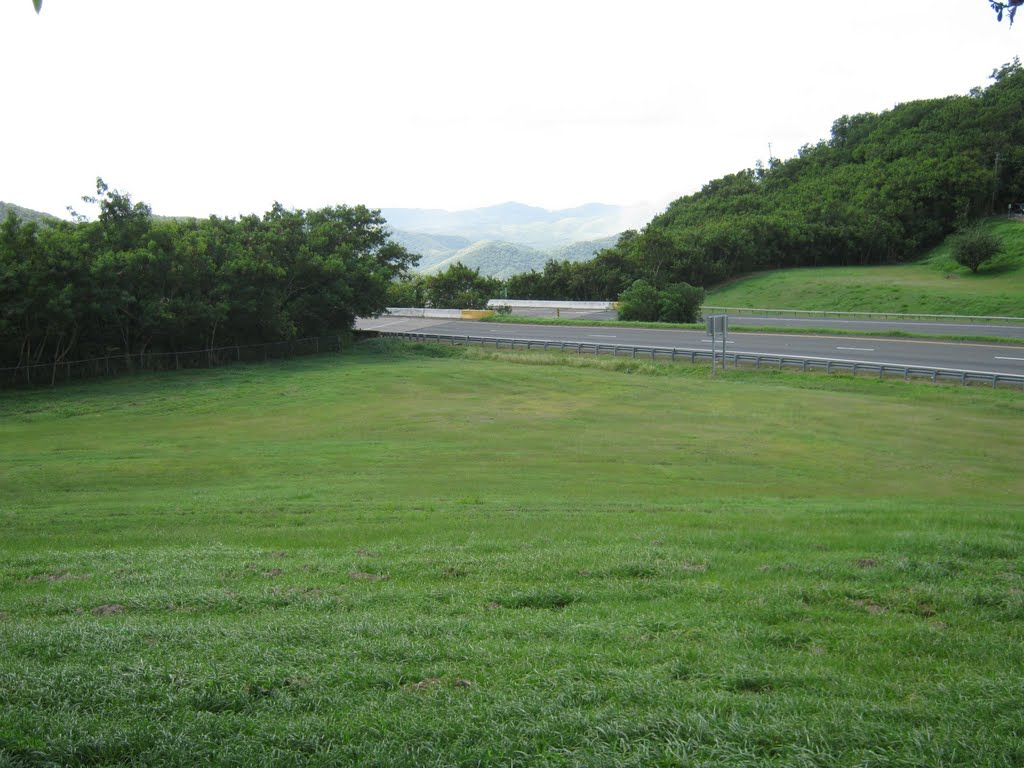
- Rest area on PR-52 in Palmas

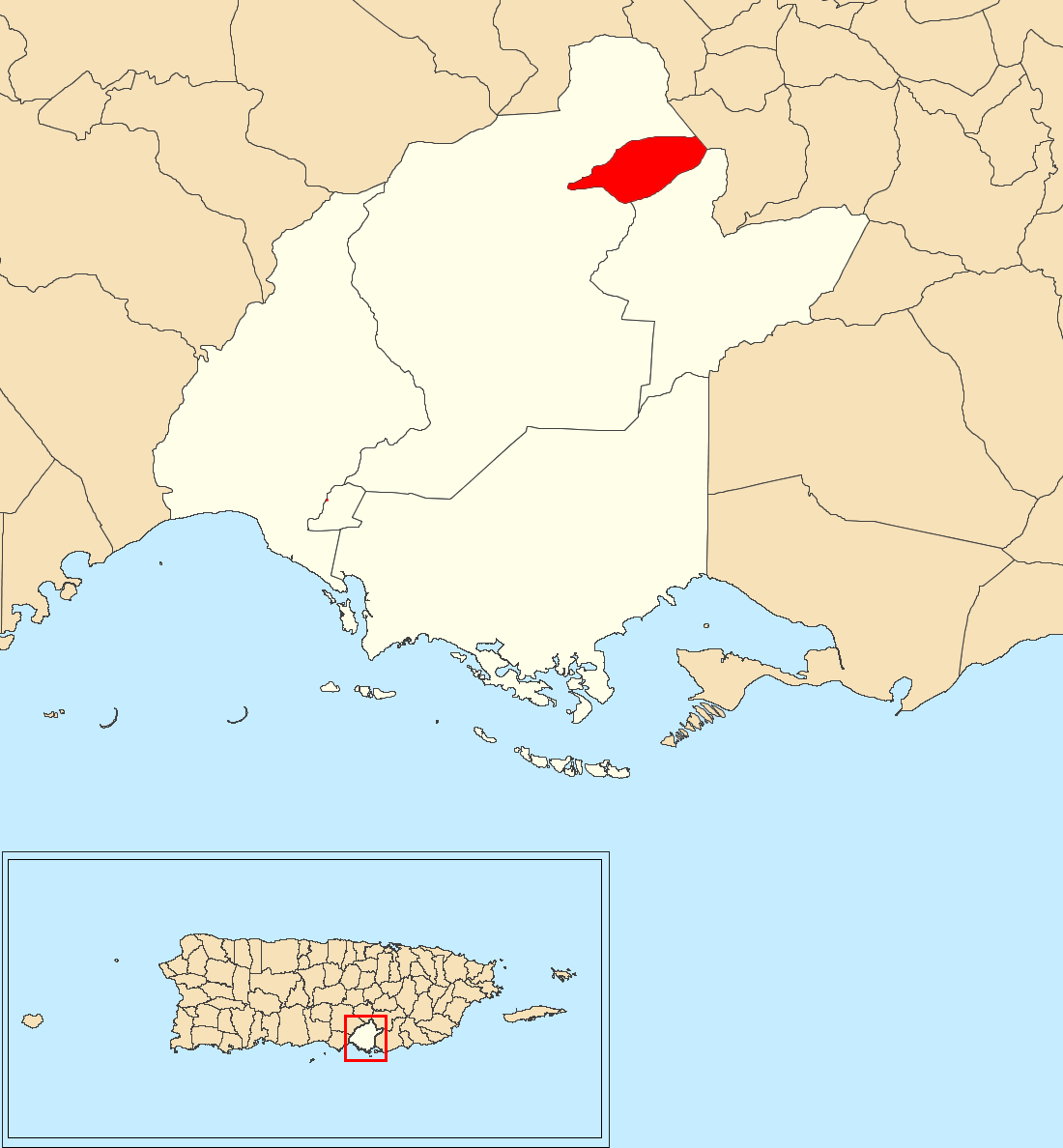
- Location of Palmas within the municipality of Salinas shown in red

- Location of Puerto Rico
- Coordinates: 18°03′48″N 66°13′17″W
- Commonwealth: Puerto Rico
- Municipality: Salinas

Area
  - Total: 1.37 sq mi (3.5 km^{2})
  - Land: 1.37 sq mi (3.5 km^{2})
  - Water: 0 sq mi (0 km^{2})
- Elevation: 1,480 ft (450 m)

Population (2010)
  - Total: 313
  - Density: 228.5/sq mi (88.2/km^{2})
- Source: 2010 Census
- Time zone: UTC−4 (AST)

Palmas is a barrio in the municipality of Salinas, Puerto Rico. Its population in 2010 was 313.

== History ==
Palmas was in Spain's gazetteers until Puerto Rico was ceded by Spain in the aftermath of the Spanish–American War under the terms of the Treaty of Paris of 1898 and became an unincorporated territory of the United States. In 1899, the United States Department of War conducted a census of Puerto Rico finding that the combined population of Palmas and Quebrada Yeguas barrios was 981.

Historical population
Census	Pop.	Note	%±
1910	387		—
1920	250		−35.4%
1930	292		16.8%
1940	240		−17.8%
1950	446		85.8%
1960	519		16.4%
1970	429		−17.3%
1980	432		0.7%
1990	381		−11.8%
2000	434		13.9%
2010	313		−27.9%
U.S. Decennial Census; 1900 (N/A) 1910-1930; 1930-1950 1980-2000 2010

== See also ==
- List of communities in Puerto Rico
