= Karilyn Bonilla Colón =

Puerto Rican politician

Mayor of Salinas
- Incumbent
- Assumed office January 14, 2013
- Preceded by: Carlos Rodríguez Mateo

Personal details
- Born: July 14, 1979 (age 47) Puerto Rico
- Party: Popular Democratic Party (PPD)
- Children: 1
- Education: University of Phoenix (MBA)

Karilyn Bonilla Colón is a Puerto Rican politician and the current mayor of Salinas. Bonilla is affiliated with the Popular Democratic Party (PPD) and has served as mayor since 2013. She has a Master in Business Administration from University of Phoenix.
