= Tomás Batista =

Puerto Rican sculptor

- Born: Tomás Batista Encarnación; December 7, 1935 (age 90); Luquillo, Puerto Rico
- Education: Trained at Puerto Rican Institute of Culture under the direction of the Maestro Compostela.
- Known for: sculptor
- Notable work: Crucifixion, Monumento al Jíbaro Puertorriqueño sculptures of Julia de Burgos, Hayuya, Rafael Hernández and the monument of the Cacique Loguillo
- Awards: The Medalla de la Orden del Quinto Centenario (meaning: the "Medal of the Order of the 5th Century") in 1987.

Tomás Batista (born December 7, 1935) is a Puerto Rican sculptor. He is the creator of some of Puerto Rico's most notable monuments.

== Early years ==
Batista (birth name: Tomás Batista Encarnación) was born and raised in Luquillo, Puerto Rico, a town located in the northeastern coast of Puerto Rico. His family was poor, but he did well in school and finished high school. His family recognized that their son had talent as an artist at a young age. After graduating from high school, he moved to San Juan to continue his education. There he met and went to work with the Spanish artist, Ángel Botello. In 1955, while working with Botello, Batista discovered that he had a natural talent to work with the restoration process in wood. He learned from Botello the secrets of restoration and how to work with gold on wood. In 1957, he realized his first work of art, the Crucifixion.

In 1958, Batista was awarded a grant and studied sculpting at the Puerto Rican Institute of Culture under the direction of the Maestro Compostela. Batista also studied art in La Escuela Nacional de Bellas Artes La Esmeralda in Mexico City, Mexico on a Guggenheim fellowship in 1960 and in the Instituto de Cultura Hispánica in Spain. In 1966, he was named director of the Department of Sculpture and Restoration of the Puerto Rican Institute of Culture. In 1972, Batista spent a year in Spain, where he created the busts of Eugenio María de Hostos and Ramón Emeterio Betances.

== Sculptures ==
He created is Monumento al Jíbaro Puertorriqueño (Monument to the Common Puerto Rican Countryman) in Cayey. In this monument Batista reflects the humbleness and hard working nature of the typical Puerto Rican farmer and his family. The monument is located by the Luis A. Ferré Highway in Cayey.

Among Batista's other works are the sculptures of Julia de Burgos in Carolina, Hayuya in Jayuya, and Rafael Hernández in Bayamón. In 1993, he unveiled the monument of the Cacique Loguillo which is located in his hometown.

== Awards and recognition ==
He received a second place prize in sculpture in "Concurso Esso para Artistas Jóvenes" held in San Juan in November 1964. His stone sculpture, "Caracol," subsequently traveled to Washington, DC, where it was part of the Puerto Rican delegation in the Esso Salon of Young Artists, a contest held in 1965 for young Latin American artists sponsored by the Pan American Union and Esso. In 1976, he was named "The Most Outstanding Young Man in Puerto Rico" by the Junior Chamber of Commerce. In 1987 Batista was awarded the "Medalla de la Orden del Quinto Centenario" ("Medal of the Order of the 5th Century"), during the commemoration of Puerto Rico's discovered by Christopher Columbus.

The City of Bayamón is the sponsor of Batista's work with a permanent exposition in the Salón Batista. In 1991, a permanent exhibition of his works was also established in his native city of Luquillo. Tomás Batista's works of art are found in museums in Puerto Rico, New York and Washington, D.C., and also in private collections. Batista currently travels around the island and abroad giving conferences about his art.

== Gallery ==
One of Tomás Batista's works
El Monumento al jíbaro Puertorriqueño

== See also ==
- List of Puerto Ricans
