= Salinas, Puerto Rico =

Town and municipality in Puerto Rico

Salinas Municipio de Salinas
- Town and Municipality
- Salinas del Abey
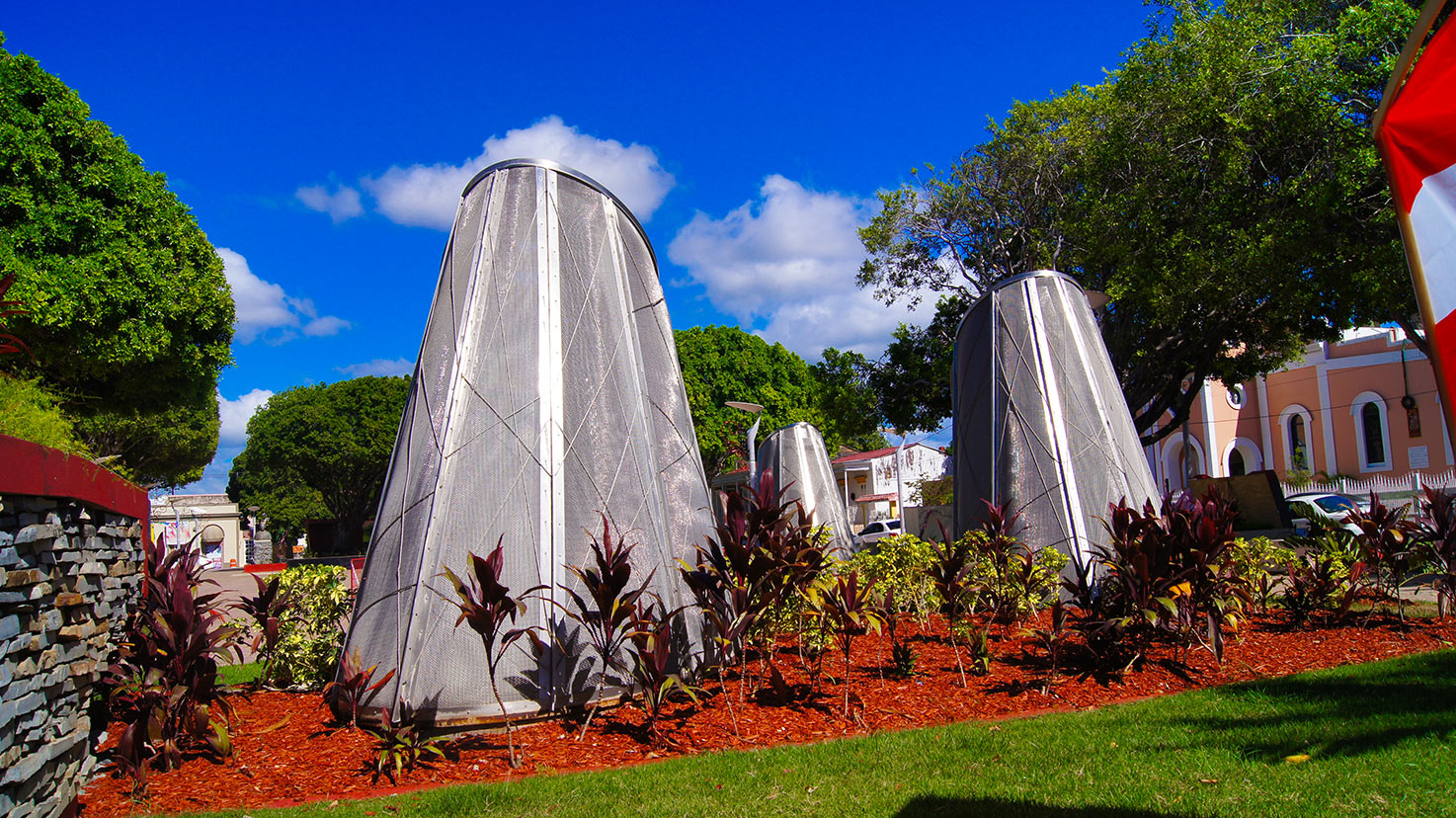
- Plaza de Salinas

- Flag Coat of arms
- Nicknames: "El Pueblo del Mojo Isleño", "Cuna del Mojito Isleño", "Los Marlins", "El pueblo de Abey"
- Anthem: "Salinas"
- Map of Puerto Rico highlighting Salinas Municipality
- Coordinates: 17.977°N 66.298°W
- Sovereign state: United States
- Commonwealth: Puerto Rico
- Settled: 1800
- Founded: September 24, 1820
- Re-incorporated: July 22, 1851
- Founder: Don Juan de la Rosa
- Barrios: 6 barrios: Aguirre; Lapa; Palmas; Quebrada Yeguas; Río Jueyes; Salinas barrio-pueblo

Government
  - Mayor: Karilyn Bonilla Colón (PPD)
  - Senatorial dist.: 6 – Guayama
  - Representative dist.: 30

Area
  - Total: 69.7 sq mi (180.4 km^{2})

Population (2020)
  - Total: 25,789
  - Estimate (2025): 24,218 ▼
  - Rank: 46th in Puerto Rico
  - Density: 370.3/sq mi (143.0/km^{2})
  - Racial groups (2020 Census): 16.3%White; 9.8% Black; 0.6% American Indian/AN; 0.0% Asian; 0.0% Native Hawaiian/PI; 32.3% Some other race 41.0% Two or more races
- Demonym: Salinenses
- Time zone: UTC-4 (AST)
- ZIP Code: 00751
- Area code: 787/939
- Website: salinaspuertorico.com

Salinas (Spanish pronunciation: [saˈlinas], locally [saˈlinaʔ]) is a town and municipality in the southern part of Puerto Rico located in the southern coast of the island, south of Aibonito and Cayey; southeast of Coamo, east of Santa Isabel; and west of Guayama. Salinas is spread over five barrios and Salinas Pueblo, which is the downtown area and administrative center of the city.

It has long been a fishing spot for Puerto Ricans, known for its beaches, its variety of fish, and as the birthplace of the famous "mojo isleño".

Although Salinas does not have any commercial airports, there is a military training area there, Camp Santiago, which is one of the training centers of the Puerto Rico National Guard. Army National Guard, Air National Guard, State Guard, U.S. Army Reserve Officers' Training Corps (ROTC), the United States Army Reserve, and the United States Army also conduct military training at Camp Santiago.

== History ==
Salinas was founded in 1840. On July 22, 1841, its first municipal council was established by Don Agustín Colón Pacheco as Mayor, Don Jose Maria Cadavedo as Sargent of Arms, Don Juan Colon as Captain of the Civil Guard and five hacendados which were Don Antonio Semidey, Don Antonio Morelli, Don Francisco Secola, Don Julio Delannoy and Don Jose Antonio Torres. In 1847 it was annexed to the municipality of Guayama until 1851 when it regained its status as a municipality.

Puerto Rico was ceded by Spain in the aftermath of the Spanish–American War under the terms of the Treaty of Paris of 1898 and became a territory of the United States. In 1899, the United States conducted its first census of Puerto Rico, finding that the population of Salinas was 5,731.

In the 21st century the availability of clean drinking water has become an issue for Puerto Rico and especially for Salinas, which is located in a dry region of the island.

On September 20, 2017 Hurricane Maria struck the island of Puerto Rico. In Salinas, 2,800 homes were destroyed by the winds, flooded rivers, and ocean surge.

During Hurricane Fiona on September 18, 2022, flood waters from 760 millimetres (30 in) of rain caused the river to flood neighborhoods and destroy homes in Salinas.

== Geography ==
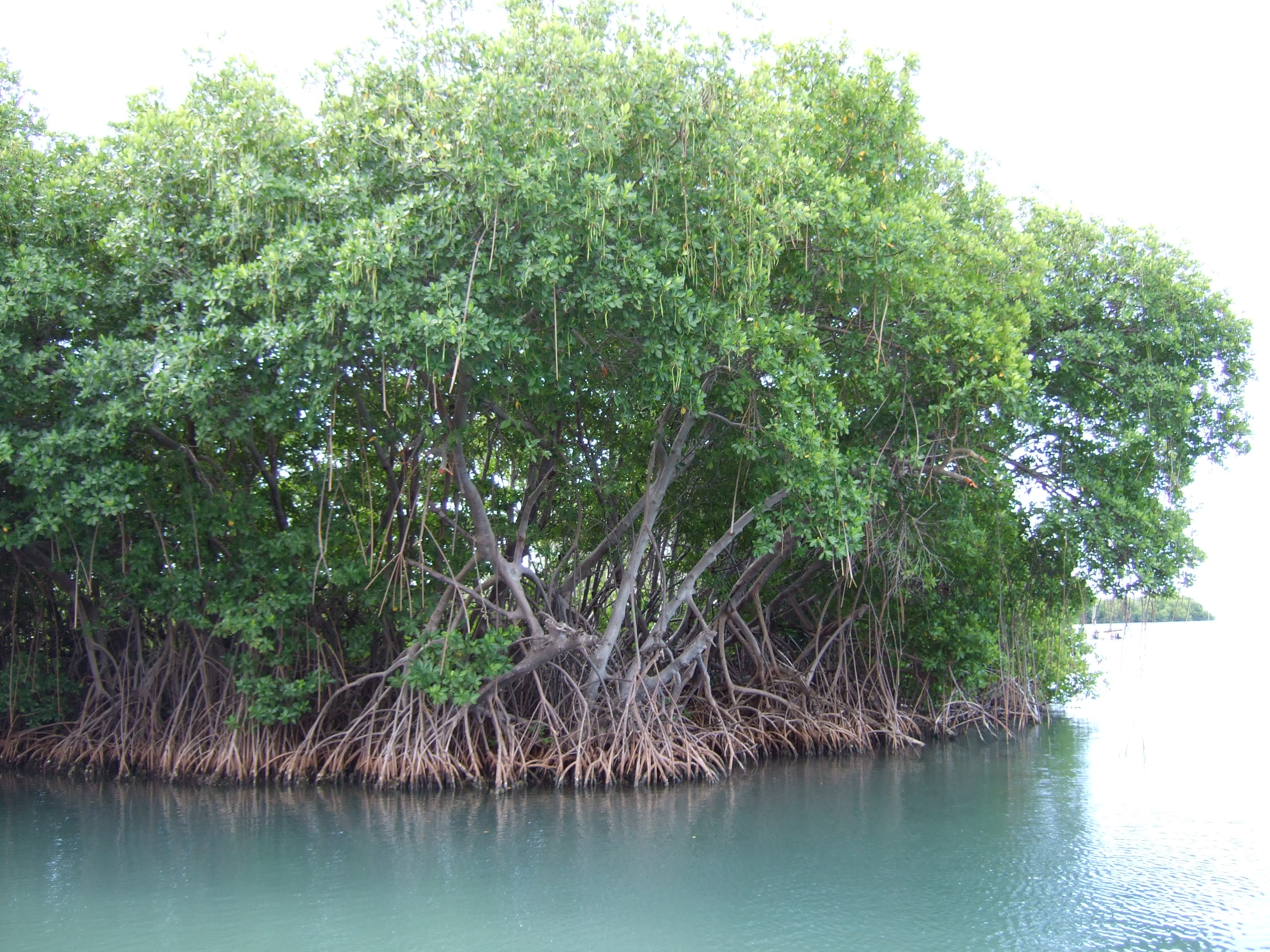
Mangroves in Salinas

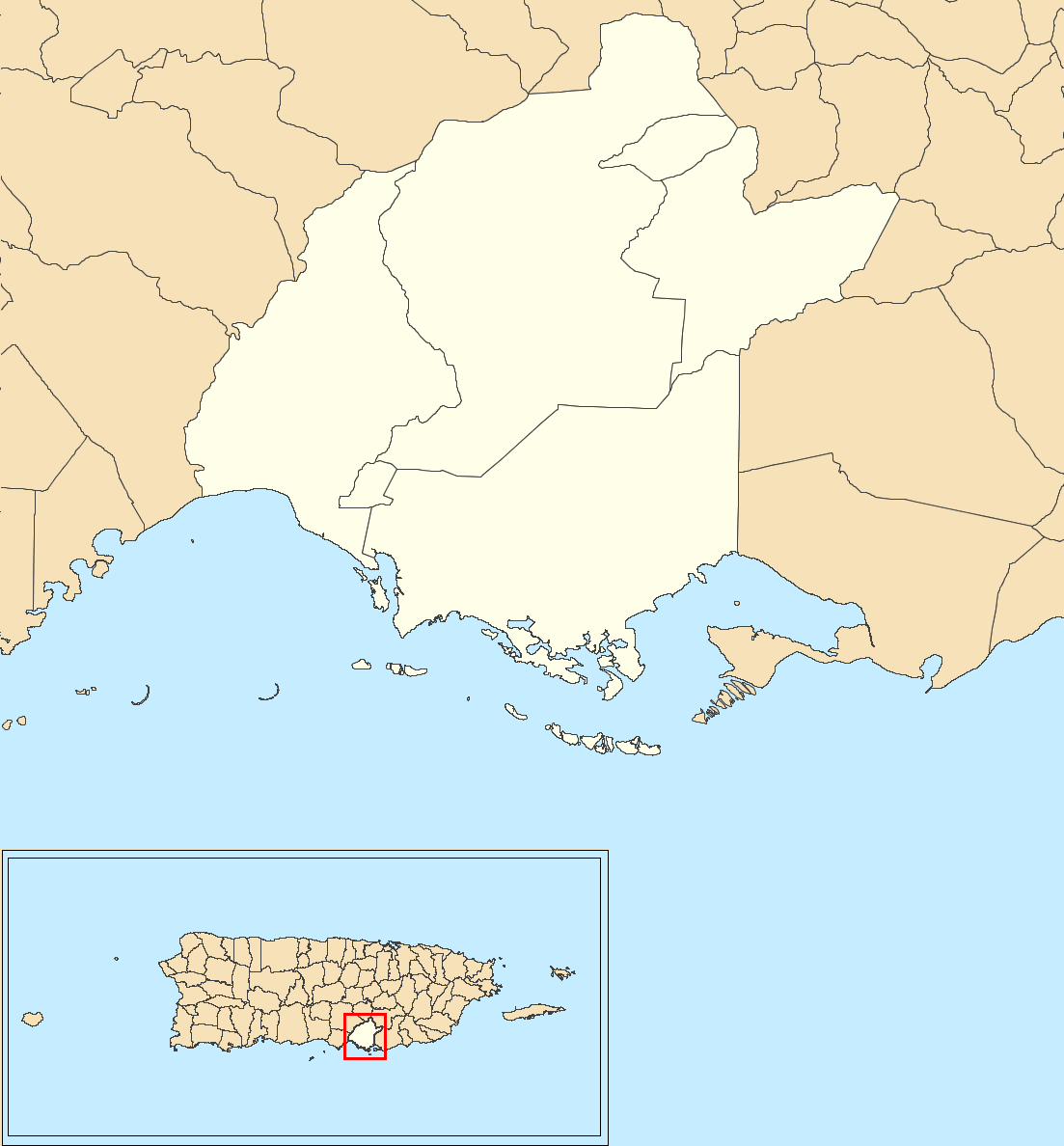
Subdivisions of Salinas.

The municipality of Salinas is located on the southern coast. The relief is mountainous in the north and flat along the coast in the south. The highest point in the municipality is Cerro Las Tetas, officially known as Las Piedras del Collado, at 2,762 feet (or 842) above sea level. Several canyons and gorges are found within the municipality, such as El Callao, La Palma y Majada, and Pasto Viejo. In the coast, Punta Arctias and Mar Negro lagoons are found within the protected Jobos Bay area. The latter was formerly a year-round bioluminescent lagoon but lost this natural feature after decades of agricultural and tourism exploit; however, thanks to habitat revitalization and the protection of the surrounding ecosystem, some bioluminescence can still be experienced at certain times of the year today.

=== Barrios ===
Like all municipalities of Puerto Rico, Salinas is subdivided into barrios. The municipal buildings, central square and large Catholic church are located in a barrio referred to as "el pueblo".

1. Aguirre
2. Lapa
3. Palmas
4. Quebrada Yeguas
5. Río Jueyes
6. Salinas barrio-pueblo

=== Sectors ===
Barrios (which are like minor civil divisions) and subbarrios, are further subdivided into smaller areas called sectores (sectors in English). The types of sectores may vary, from normally sector to urbanización to reparto to barriada to residencial, among others.

=== Special Communities ===
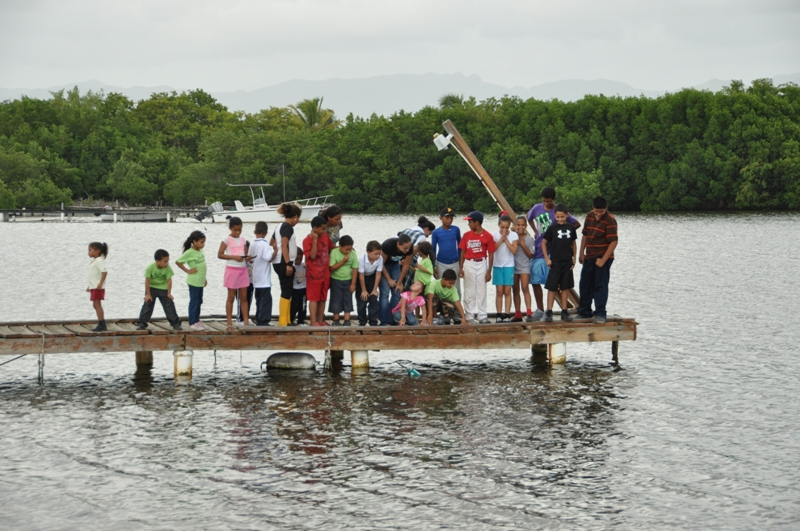
Children of Las Mareas community welcoming "Tuque the manatee"

Comunidades Especiales de Puerto Rico (Special Communities of Puerto Rico) are marginalized communities whose citizens are experiencing a certain amount of social exclusion. A map shows these communities occur in nearly every municipality of the commonwealth. Of the 742 places that were on the list in 2014, the following barrios, communities, sectors, or neighborhoods were in Salinas: Las Mareas, Playita, el Coco, Comunidad Aguirre, El Coquí, Parcelas Vázquez, San Felipe, Sector Borinquén, and Sector Villa Cofresi.

=== Climate ===
Climate chart for Salinas

According to data provided by the Aguirre weather station, Salinas has a tropical savanna climate (Köppen: Aw). The annual average temperature of Salinas is 78.3 °F (25.7 °C), of which August is the hottest month with an average temperature of 81.0 °F (27.2 °C), and January is the coolest month with an average temperature of 75.2 °F (24.0 °C). There are about 105 days with a temperature above 90 °F (32 °C) every year, and there are 4 hot days with a temperature above 95 °F (35 °C) every year; at the same time, there are also 4 nights with a temperature below 60 °F (16 °C) every year. The annual precipitation in Salinas is 40.37 inches (1,025 mm), of which the rainy season is from May to November, and the precipitation accounts for about 82.5% of the whole year. Among them, September is the wettest, and the precipitation can reach 6.85 inches (174 mm). The temperature extremes ever recorded in Salinas ranged from 51 °F (11 °C) on December 3, 2013 to 100 °F (38 °C) on September 18, 2016.

Climate data for Aguirre, Salinas (1991–2020 normals, extremes 1955–present)
Month	Jan	Feb	Mar	Apr	May	Jun	Jul	Aug	Sep	Oct	Nov	Dec	Year
Record high °F (°C)	93 (34)	92 (33)	94 (34)	96 (36)	94 (34)	98 (37)	98 (37)	99 (37)	100 (38)	98 (37)	96 (36)	95 (35)	100 (38)
Mean maximum °F (°C)	89.2 (31.8)	89.5 (31.9)	89.7 (32.1)	90.8 (32.7)	91.0 (32.8)	92.3 (33.5)	93.7 (34.3)	94.6 (34.8)	94.7 (34.8)	92.8 (33.8)	91.8 (33.2)	90.7 (32.6)	95.8 (35.4)
Mean daily maximum °F (°C)	84.1 (28.9)	84.1 (28.9)	84.3 (29.1)	85.4 (29.7)	86.4 (30.2)	87.3 (30.7)	87.8 (31.0)	88.6 (31.4)	88.5 (31.4)	87.7 (30.9)	86.8 (30.4)	85.2 (29.6)	86.4 (30.2)
Daily mean °F (°C)	75.2 (24.0)	75.6 (24.2)	75.7 (24.3)	77.3 (25.2)	79.2 (26.2)	80.6 (27.0)	80.6 (27.0)	81.0 (27.2)	80.6 (27.0)	79.8 (26.6)	78.3 (25.7)	76.3 (24.6)	78.3 (25.7)
Mean daily minimum °F (°C)	66.4 (19.1)	67.1 (19.5)	67.1 (19.5)	69.2 (20.7)	72.0 (22.2)	73.9 (23.3)	73.5 (23.1)	73.4 (23.0)	72.8 (22.7)	71.8 (22.1)	69.9 (21.1)	67.5 (19.7)	70.4 (21.3)
Mean minimum °F (°C)	62.2 (16.8)	63.1 (17.3)	62.9 (17.2)	64.3 (17.9)	67.4 (19.7)	70.3 (21.3)	68.7 (20.4)	69.4 (20.8)	69.0 (20.6)	67.8 (19.9)	65.7 (18.7)	63.4 (17.4)	59.7 (15.4)
Record low °F (°C)	55 (13)	57 (14)	54 (12)	57 (14)	60 (16)	62 (17)	61 (16)	58 (14)	58 (14)	57 (14)	54 (12)	51 (11)	51 (11)
Average precipitation inches (mm)	1.26 (32)	1.24 (31)	1.36 (35)	1.51 (38)	4.51 (115)	2.92 (74)	3.60 (91)	5.27 (134)	6.85 (174)	5.66 (144)	4.53 (115)	1.66 (42)	40.37 (1,025)
Average precipitation days (≥ 0.01 in)	6.6	6.6	5.8	6.5	8.8	11.1	9.6	9.8	10.1	11.0	9.6	7.3	102.8
Source: NOAA

== Economy ==
=== Agriculture ===
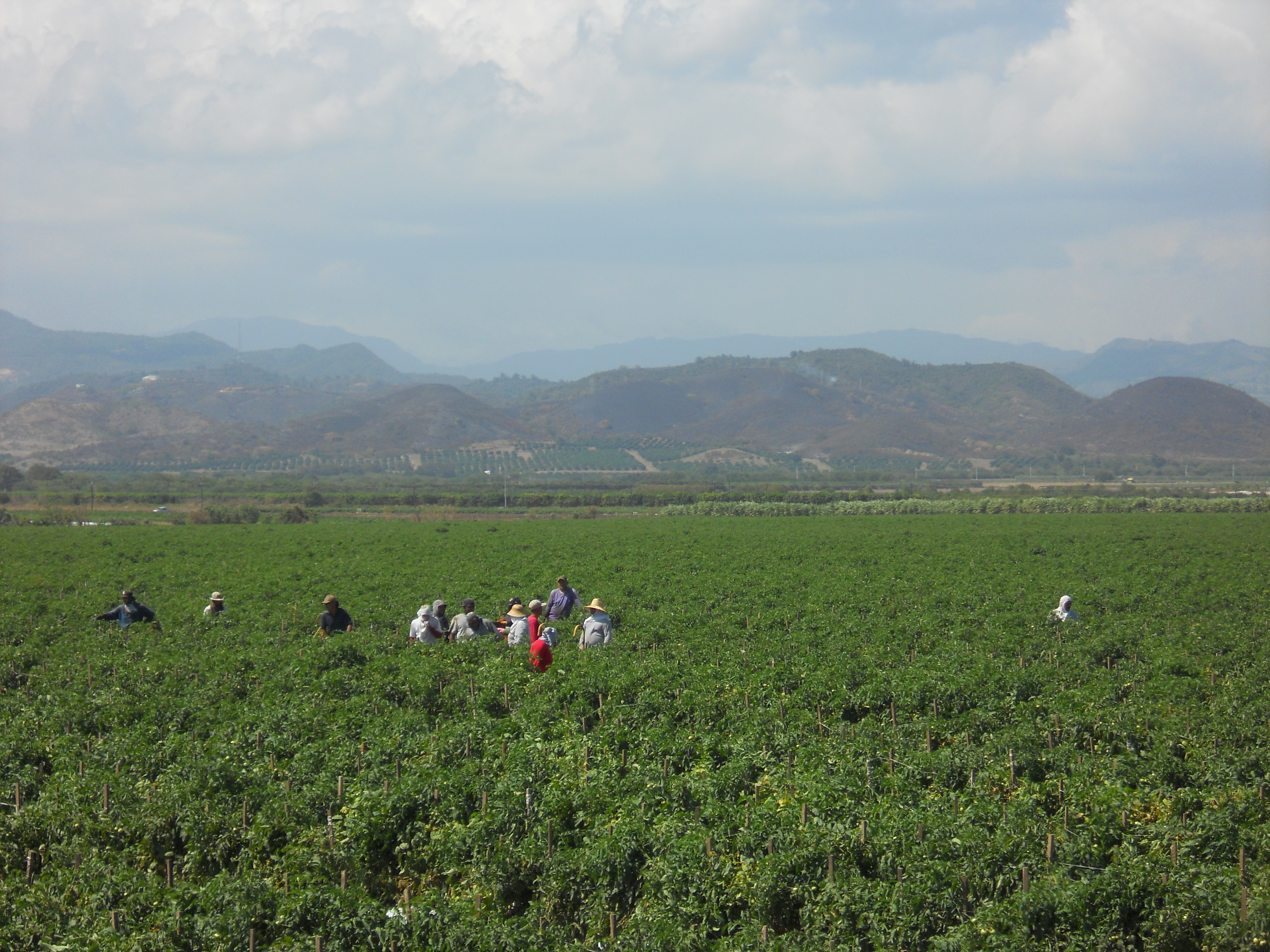
Picking tomatoes in Salinas

Salinas is one of the main agricultural producers on the southern coast of Puerto Rico. It has large banana and papaya farms in its Lapa and Aguirre barrios. The Río Jueyes barrio is one of the main producers of beef in the south, counting with La Hacienda Las Carolinas which supplies Ganaderia Santiago, a slaughter house, with meat. Salinas also is headquarters for Canto Alegre, a company which specializes in poultry. This company supplies most of Puerto Rico's supermarkets with fresh poultry.

=== Business ===
- Apparel
- Commercial fishing: Salinas has a private marina with a hotel and convention center.

=== Industry ===
The Aguirre Sugar Cane Mill was the last operational sugarcane mill in Puerto Rico and closed its doors in 1993. The Central Aguirre Historic District is listed on the National Register of Historic places but there are no current plans to renovate the area and is now mostly in ruins. Some other industries in Salinas include electrical and electronic machinery, plastics, sunglasses.

== Tourism ==
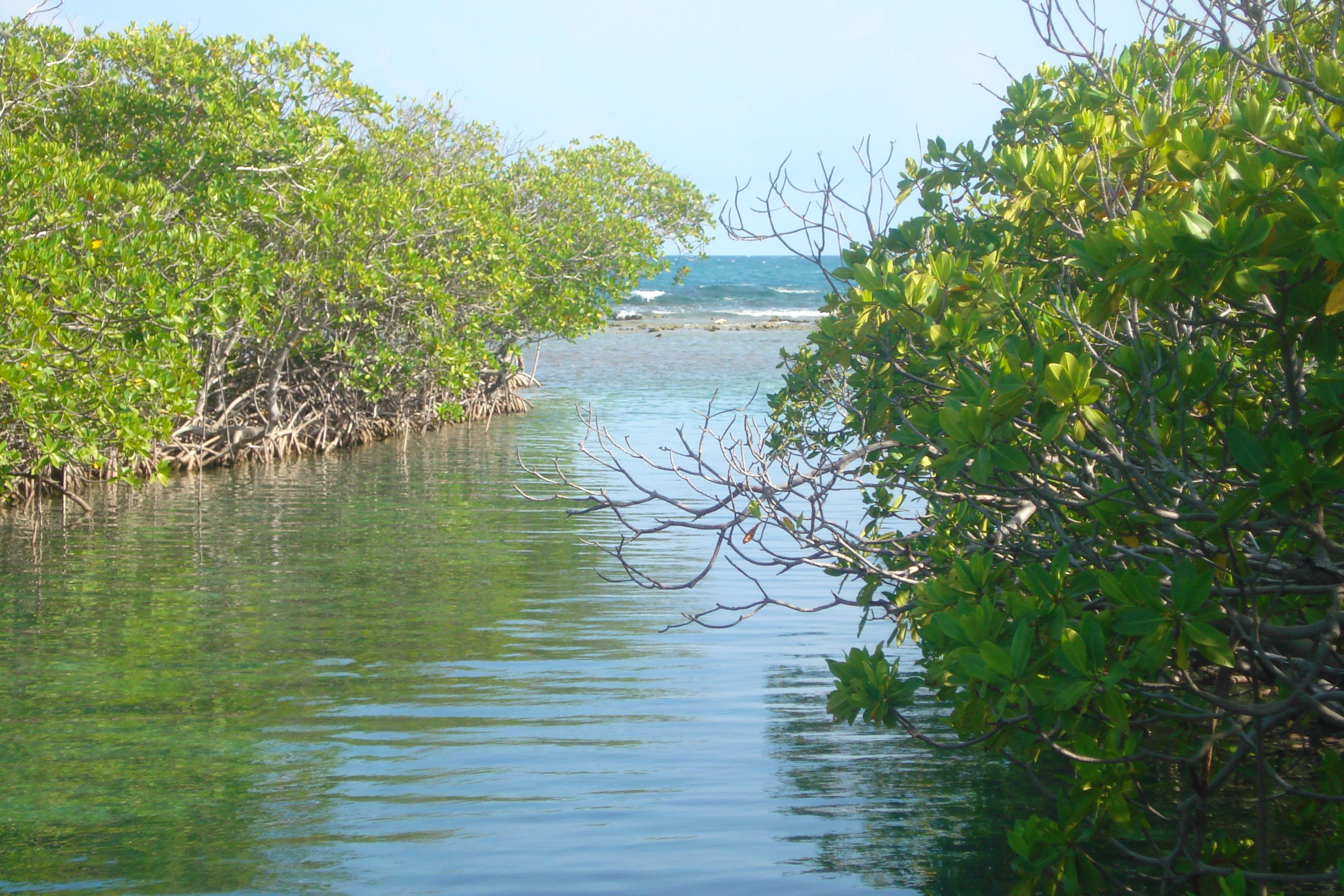
View of "El Cayo Matias" in Salinas

=== Landmarks and places of interest ===
There are 17 beaches in Salinas. Some of Salina's main attractions are:

- Albergue Olímpico (Olympic Hostel), is a sports complex and hostel with air-conditioned rooms.
- Antigua Central Aguirre (Sugar Cane Mill)
- Camp Santiago
- Montes Oscuros
- Monumento al Jíbaro

== Culture ==
=== Festivals and events ===
Salinas celebrates its patron saint festival in September. The Fiestas Patronales Nuestra Señora de la Monserrate is a religious and cultural celebration that generally features parades, games, artisans, amusement rides, regional food, and live entertainment.

Other festivals and events celebrated in Salinas include:

- Abey Carnival – February to celebrate Abey – Cacique (Chief) of Yucayeque, a former Taino village in the area of Abeyno, Salinas
- Pescao Festival – June
- Festival Del Mojo Isleño

== Demographics ==
Historical population
Census	Pop.	Note	%±
1900	5,731		—
1910	11,403		99.0%
1920	12,971		13.8%
1930	15,446		19.1%
1940	19,400		25.6%
1950	23,435		20.8%
1960	23,133		−1.3%
1970	21,837		−5.6%
1980	26,438		21.1%
1990	28,335		7.2%
2000	31,113		9.8%
2010	31,078		−0.1%
2020	25,789		−17.0%
2025 (est.)	24,218	▼	−6.1%
U.S. Decennial Census; 1899 (shown as 1900) 1910–1930; 1930–1950 1960–2000 2010 2020

Demographic distribution
Race – Salinas, Puerto Rico – 2000 Census
Race	Population	% of Total
White	4,645	74.6%
Black/African American	647	10.6%
American Indian and Alaska Native	29	0.4%
Asian	8	0.1%
Native Hawaiian/Pacific Islander	2	0.1%
Some other race	599	9.8%
Two or more races	211	4.5%

== Government ==
All municipalities in Puerto Rico are administered by a mayor, elected every four years. Karilyn Bonilla Colón (of the Popular Democratic Party) was elected as mayor at the 2012 general election, succeeding Carlos Rodríguez Mateo.

The city belongs to the Puerto Rico Senatorial district VI, which is represented by two Senators. In 2024, Rafael Santos Ortiz and Wilmer Reyes Berríos were elected as District Senators.

== Transportation ==
There are 41 bridges in Salinas.

== Symbols ==
The municipio has an official flag and coat of arms.

=== Flag ===
On a green rectangular field, five white isosceles triangles equal in size, placed in the center of the flag and forming a row that covers the extent of the background. The green represents the land and the triangles hills of salt from which the name of the town is derived.

=== Coat of arms ===
The shield uses the traditional colors of the town; green and silver. The salt knolls indicate in graphical form the name of the town: Salinas. The fish refer to the fishing. The sugar cane leaves that surround the shield, symbolize the sugar cane plantations.

== Notable people ==
- Angel "Cholo" Espada - former World Boxing Association (WBA) welterweight champion of the world
- Evelina Lopez Antonetty - Puerto Rican civil rights activist and founder of United Bronx Parents
- Zuleyka Rivera - Miss Universe 2006
- Héctor Santiago-Colón - Medal of Honor recipient in the Vietnam War
- Jay Wheeler - reggaeton singer
- Georgina Borri - (born 1954) actress
- Sandy Alomar Sr. - Puerto Rican baseball player and coach
- Sandy Alomar Jr. - Puerto Rican baseball player and coach
- Roberto Alomar - Puerto Rican baseball player and member of the National Baseball Hall of Fame

== Gallery ==
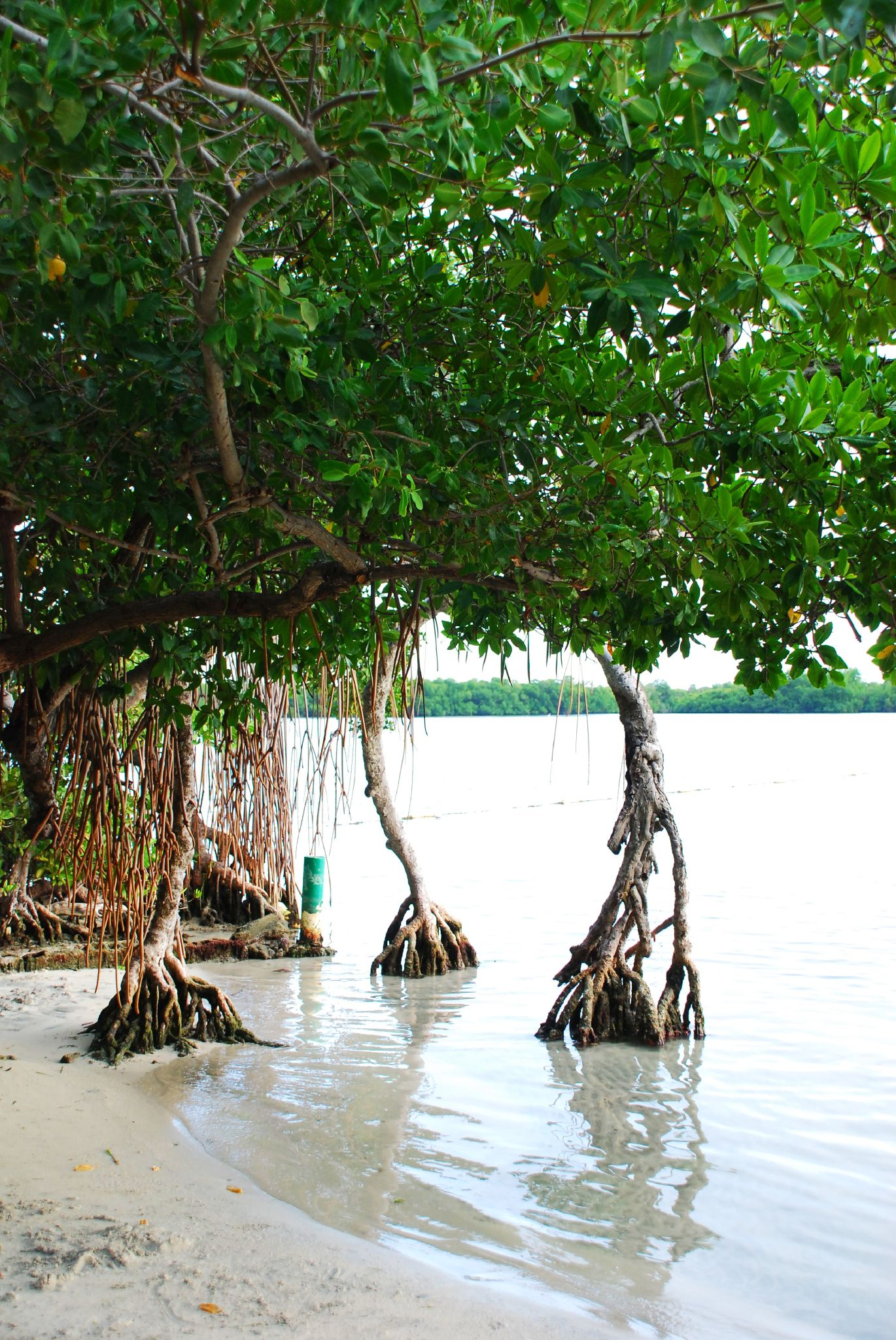
Trees in Salinas

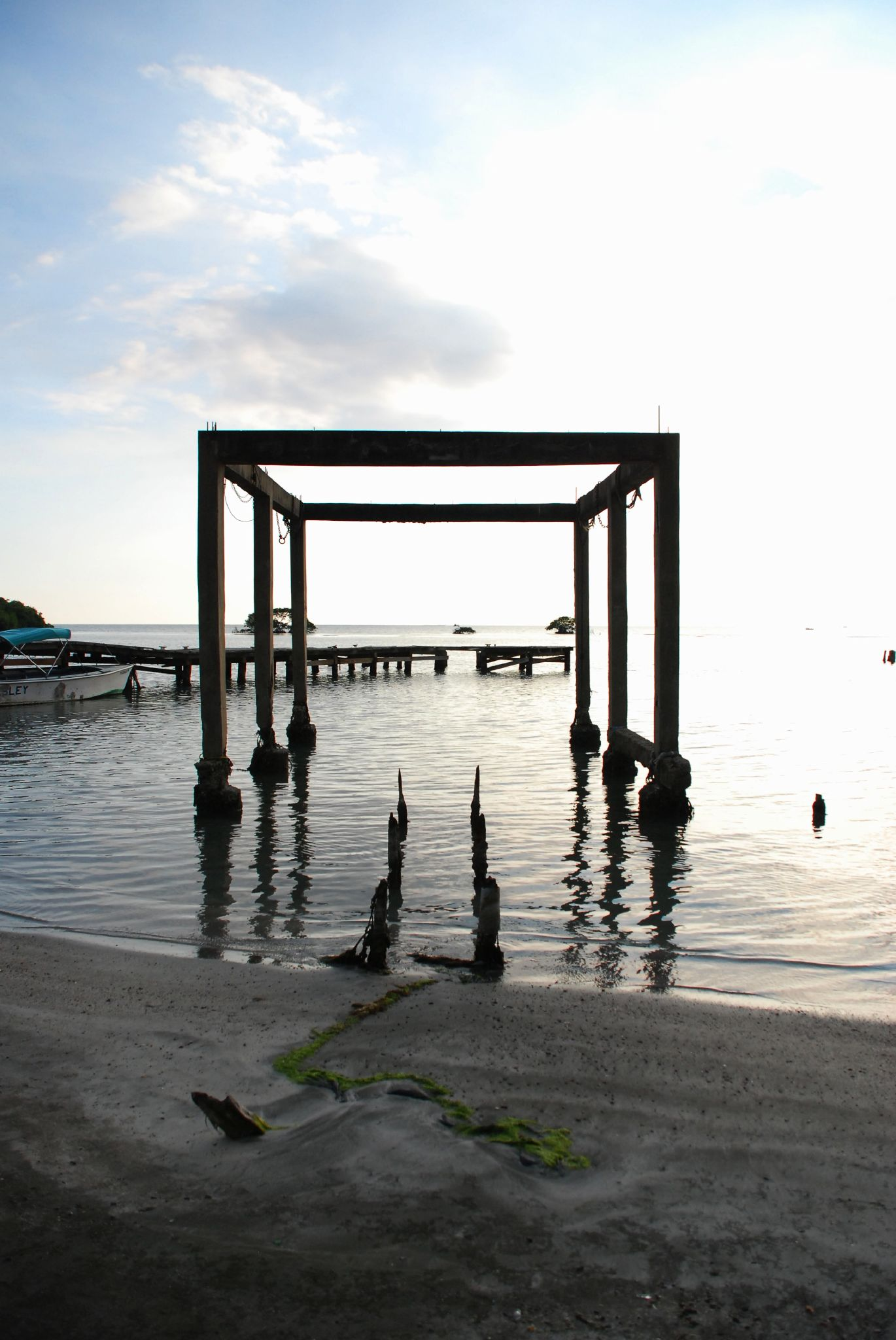
Beach in Salinas

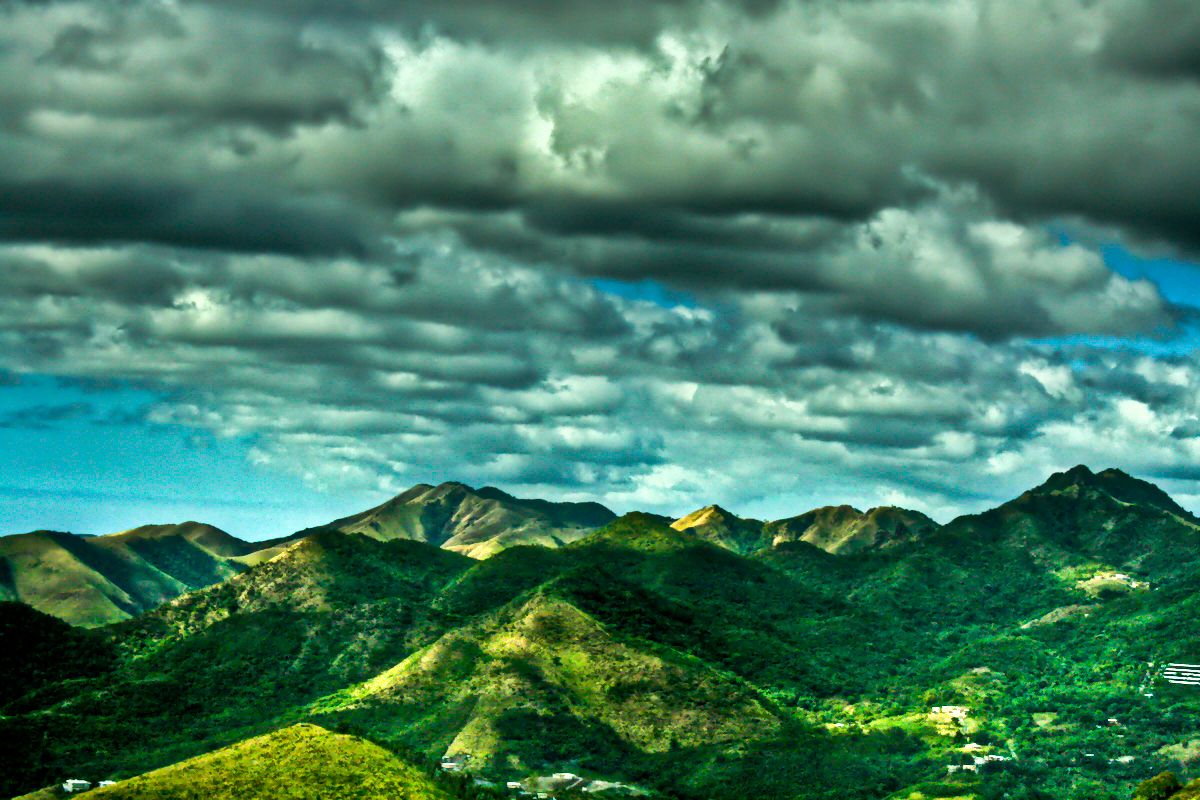
Montes Oscuros

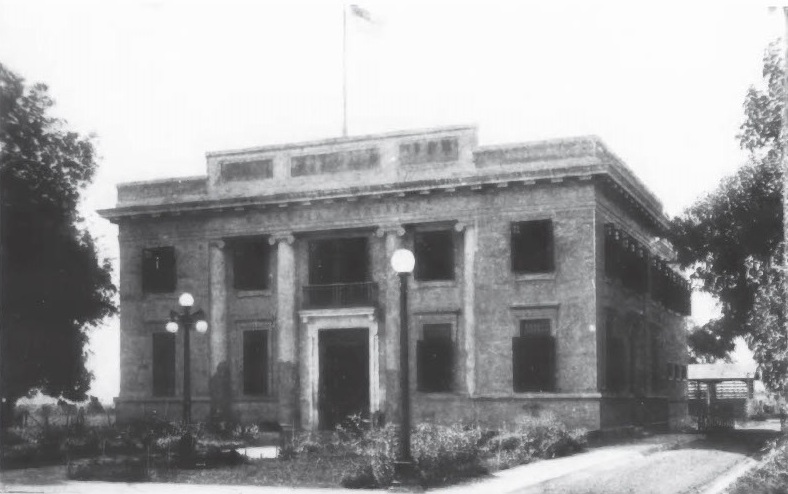
The Town hall building in 1920

== See also ==
- List of Puerto Ricans
- History of Puerto Rico
- Did you know-Puerto Rico?
