= Río Jueyes, Salinas, Puerto Rico =

Barrio of Puerto Rico

Río Jueyes
- Barrio
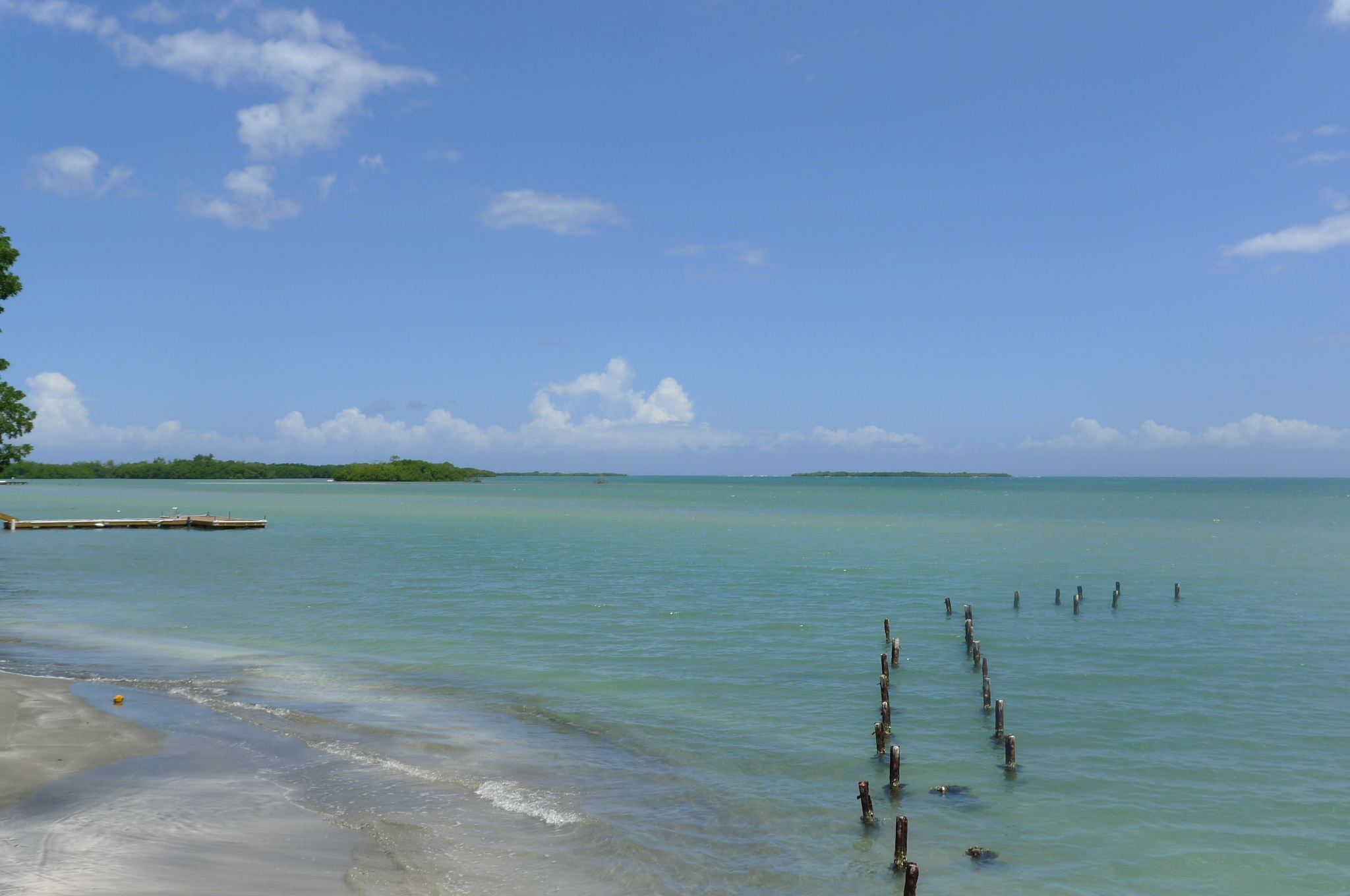
- Beach in Río Jueyes in Salinas

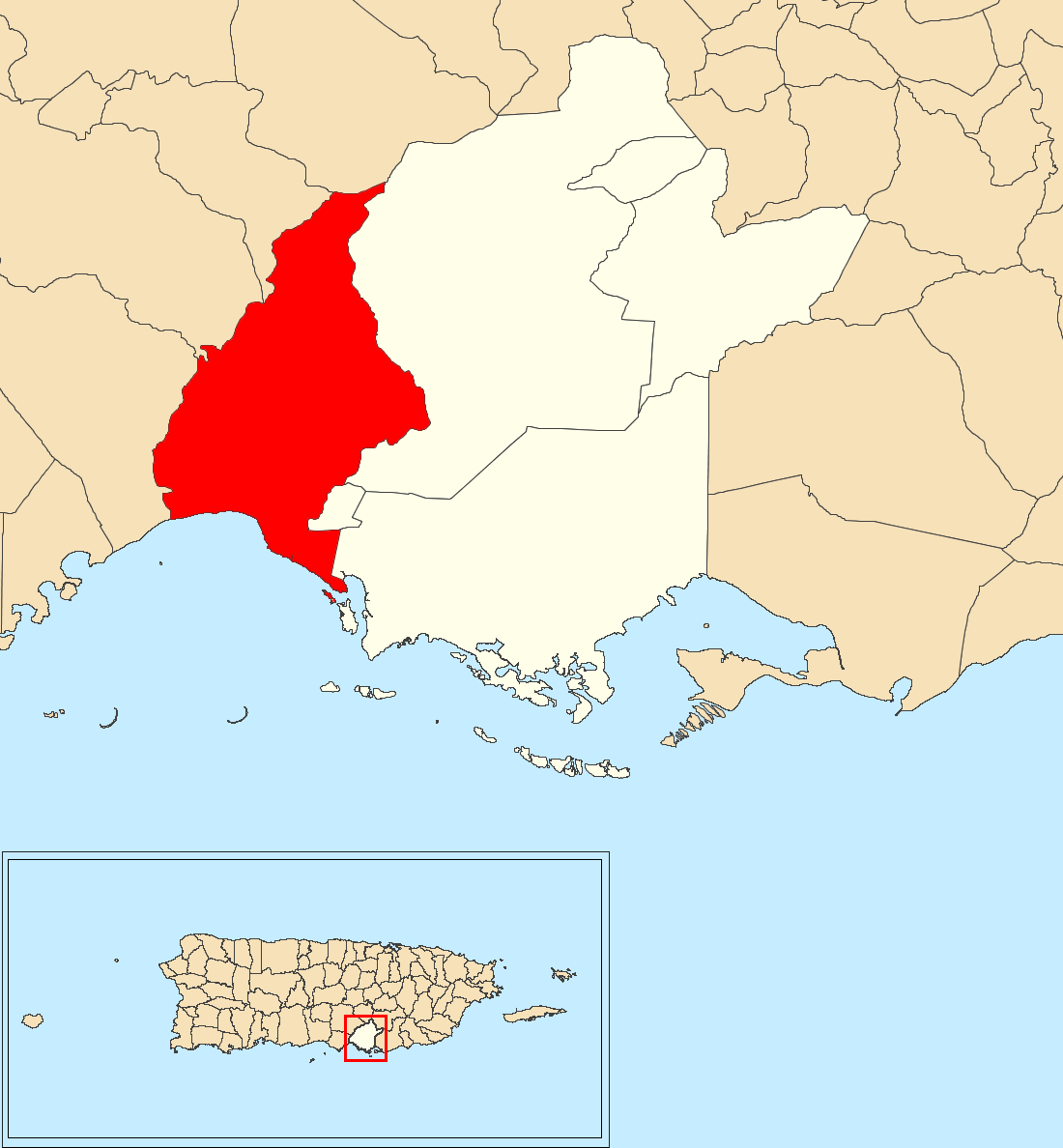
- Location of Río Jueyes within the municipality of Salinas shown in red

- Location of Puerto Rico
- Coordinates: 18°00′12″N 66°19′14″W
- Commonwealth: Puerto Rico
- Municipality: Salinas

Area
  - Total: 18.15 sq mi (47.0 km^{2})
  - Land: 14.41 sq mi (37.3 km^{2})
  - Water: 3.74 sq mi (9.7 km^{2})
- Elevation: 164 ft (50 m)

Population (2010)
  - Total: 3,360
  - Density: 233.3/sq mi (90.1/km^{2})
- Source: 2010 Census
- Time zone: UTC−4 (AST)

Río Jueyes is a barrio in the municipality of Salinas, Puerto Rico. Its population in 2010 was 3,360.

== History ==
Río Jueyes was in Spain's gazetteers until Puerto Rico was ceded by Spain in the aftermath of the Spanish–American War under the terms of the Treaty of Paris of 1898 and became an unincorporated territory of the United States. In 1899, the United States Department of War conducted a census of Puerto Rico finding that the population of Río Jueyes barrio was 1,248.

Historical population
Census	Pop.	Note	%±
1900	1,248		—
1910	1,808		44.9%
1920	2,242		24.0%
1930	2,984		33.1%
1940	3,811		27.7%
1950	4,321		13.4%
1960	3,392		−21.5%
1970	0		−100.0%
1980	4,112		—
1990	4,523		10.0%
2000	4,027		−11.0%
2010	3,360		−16.6%
U.S. Decennial Census; 1899 (shown as 1900) 1910-1930; 1930-1950 1980-2000 2010

== Gallery ==
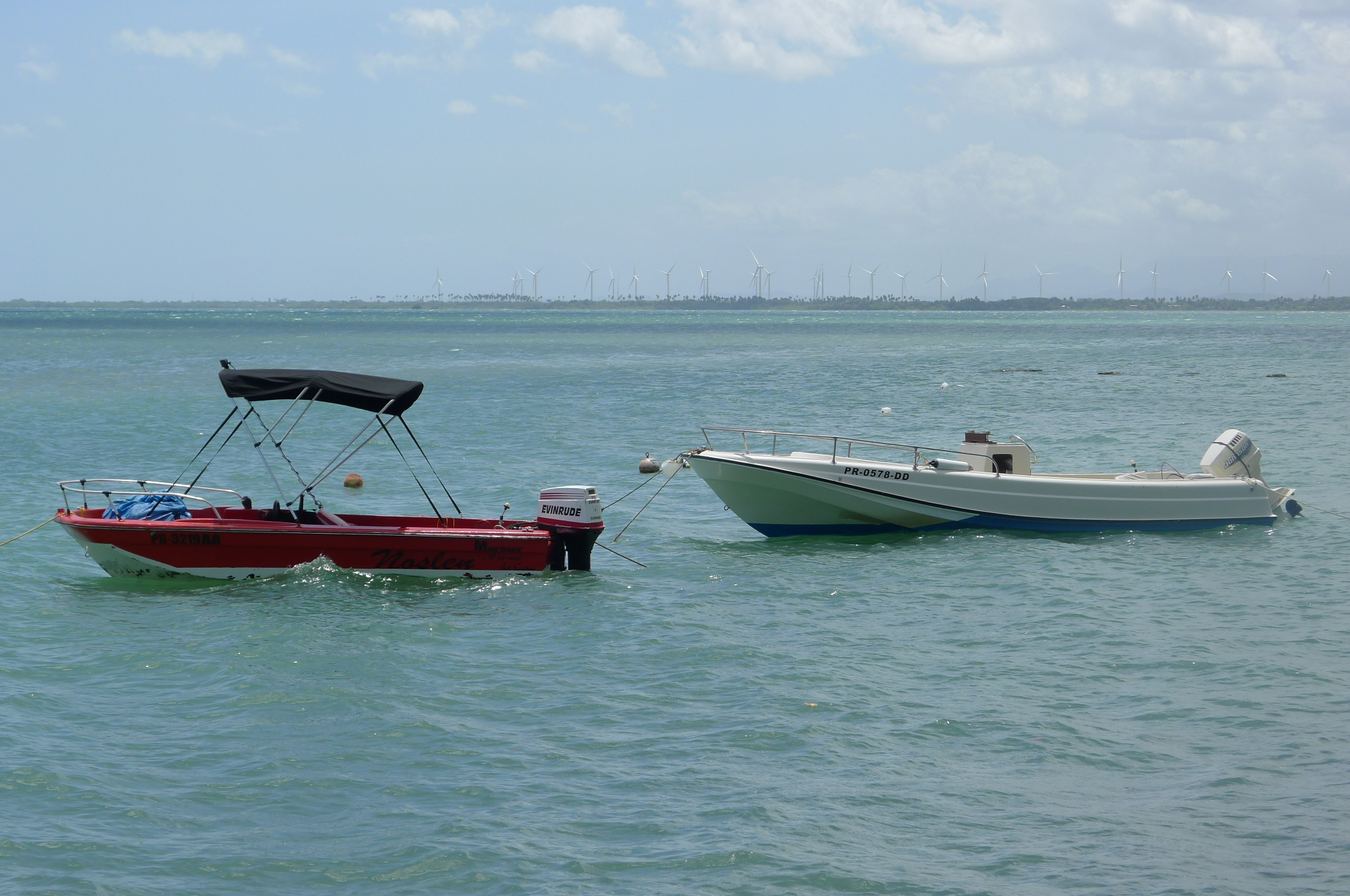

== See also ==
- List of communities in Puerto Rico
- Río Jueyes (river)
