= Salinas barrio-pueblo =

Historical and administrative center (seat) of Salinas, Puerto Rico

Salinas barrio-pueblo Pueblo de Salinas
- Municipality Seat
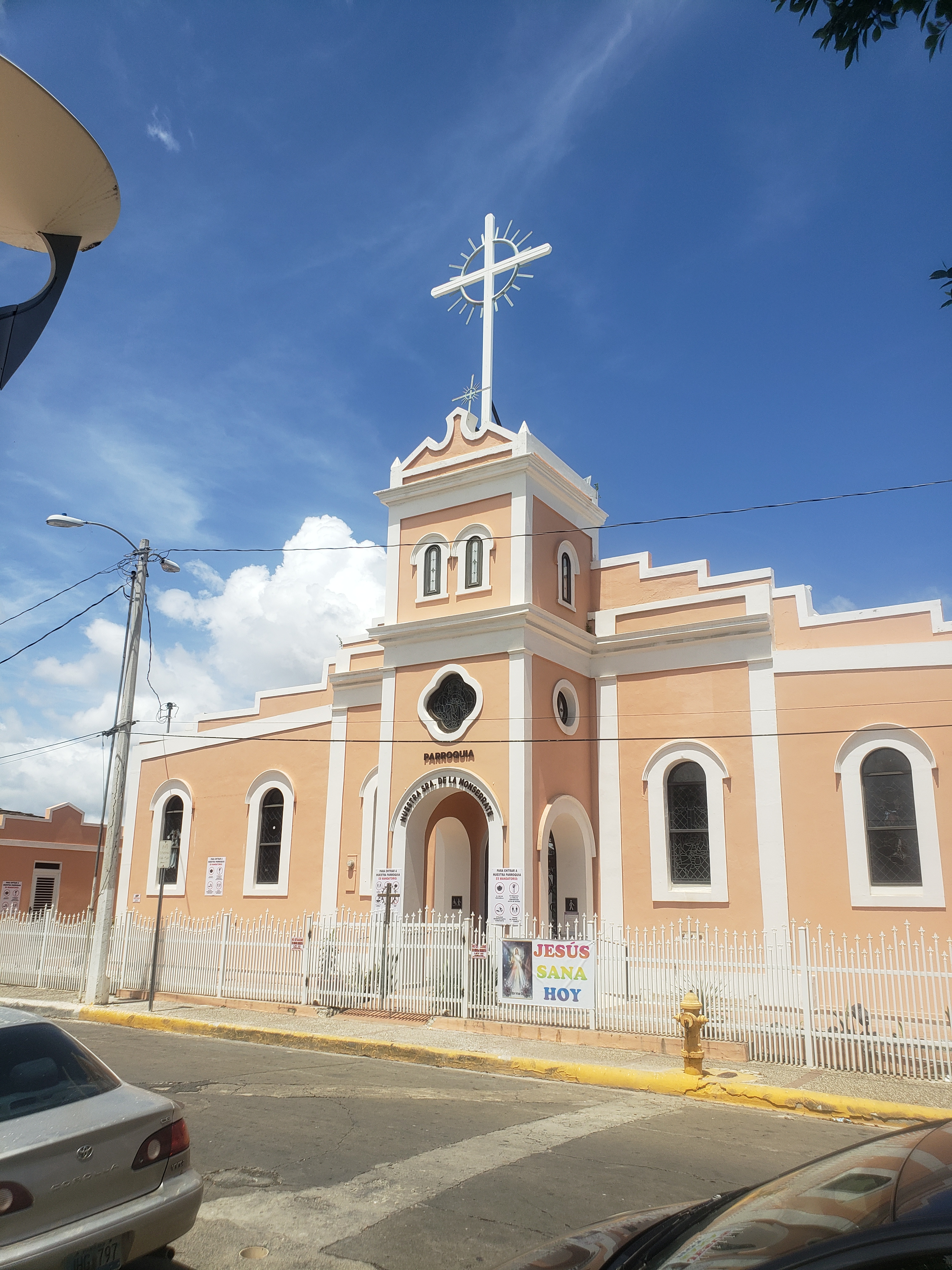
- Nuestra Señora de la Monserrate Catholic Church in Salinas

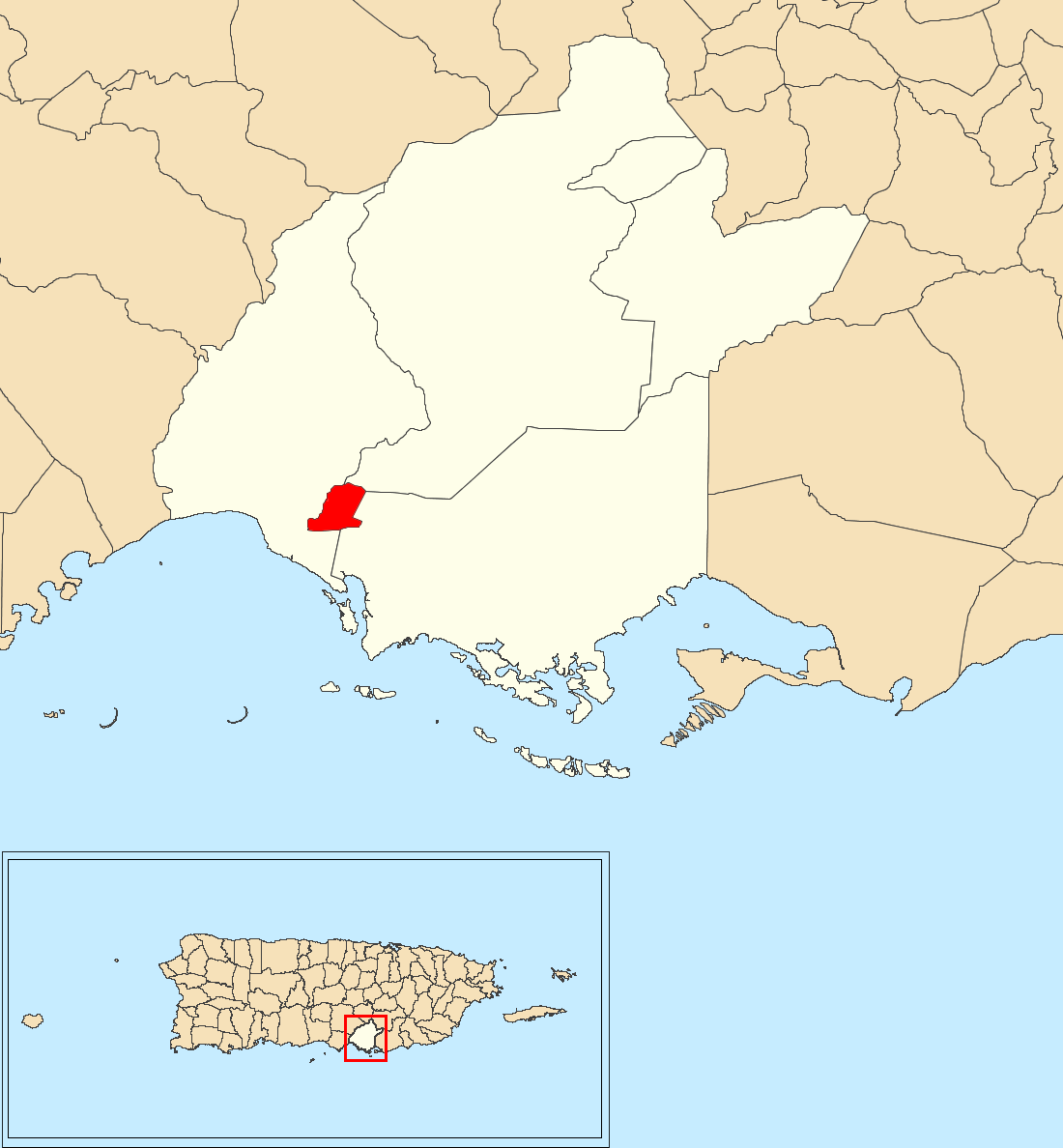
- Location of Salinas barrio-pueblo within the municipality of Salinas shown in red

- Location of Puerto Rico
- Coordinates: 17°58′45″N 66°17′48″W
- Commonwealth: Puerto Rico
- Municipality: Salinas

Area
  - Total: 0.46 sq mi (1.2 km^{2})
  - Land: 0.46 sq mi (1.2 km^{2})
  - Water: 0 sq mi (0 km^{2})
- Elevation: 23 ft (7.0 m)

Population (2010)
  - Total: 2,453
  - Density: 5,332.6/sq mi (2,058.9/km^{2})
- Source: 2010 Census
- Time zone: UTC−4 (AST)

Salinas barrio-pueblo is a barrio and the administrative center (seat) of Salinas, a municipality of Puerto Rico. Its population in 2010 was 2,453.

As was customary in Spain, in Puerto Rico, the municipality has a barrio called pueblo which contains a central plaza, the municipal buildings (city hall), and a Catholic church. Fiestas patronales (patron saint festivals) are held in the central plaza every year.

== The central plaza and its church ==
The central plaza, or square, is a place for official and unofficial recreational events and a place where people can gather and socialize from dusk to dawn. The Laws of the Indies, Spanish law, which regulated life in Puerto Rico in the early 19th century, stated the plaza's purpose was for "the parties" (celebrations, festivities) (Spanish: a propósito para las fiestas), and that the square should be proportionally large enough for the number of neighbors (Spanish: grandeza proporcionada al número de vecinos). These Spanish regulations also stated that the streets nearby should be comfortable portals for passersby, protecting them from the elements: sun and rain.

Located across the central plaza in Salinas barrio-pueblo is the Parroquia Nuestra Señora de la Monserrate, a Roman Catholic church which was constructed from 1911 to 1913. As early as 1690, there was a chapel in the pueblo. Another church was built there between 1846 and 1853.

== History ==
Salinas barrio-pueblo was in Spain's gazetteers until Puerto Rico was ceded by Spain in the aftermath of the Spanish–American War under the terms of the Treaty of Paris of 1898 and became an unincorporated territory of the United States. In 1899, the United States Department of War conducted a census of Puerto Rico finding that the population of Pueblo barrio was 1,192.

Historical population
Census	Pop.	Note	%±
1900	1,192		—
1910	1,857		55.8%
1920	1,385		−25.4%
1930	2,252		62.6%
1940	3,176		41.0%
1950	4,367		37.5%
1960	3,666		−16.1%
1970	0		−100.0%
1980	4,498		—
1990	3,543		−21.2%
2000	3,231		−8.8%
2010	2,453		−24.1%
U.S. Decennial Census; 1899 (shown as 1900) 1910-1930; 1930-1950 1980-2000 2010

== Gallery ==
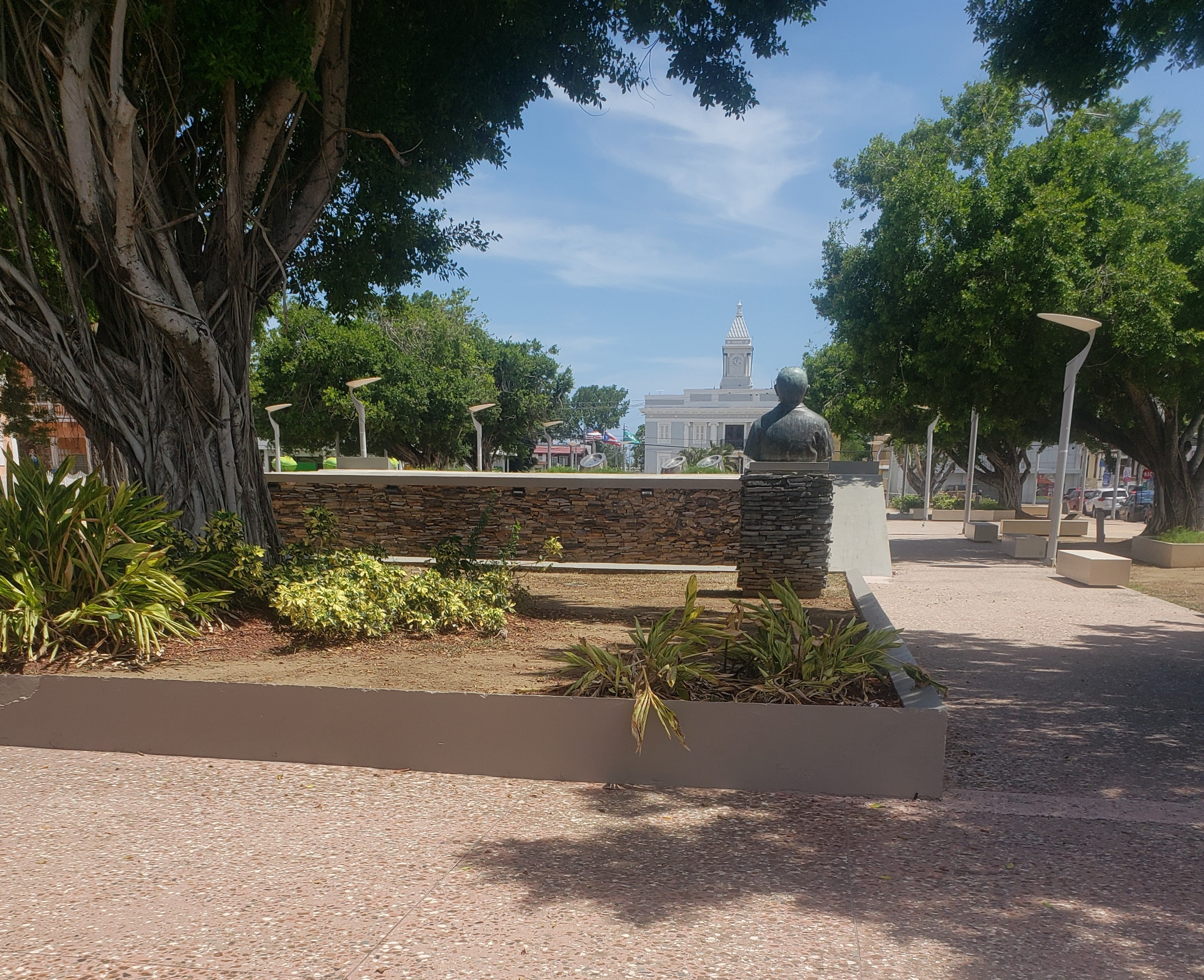
Plaza with the Town Hall in the background.

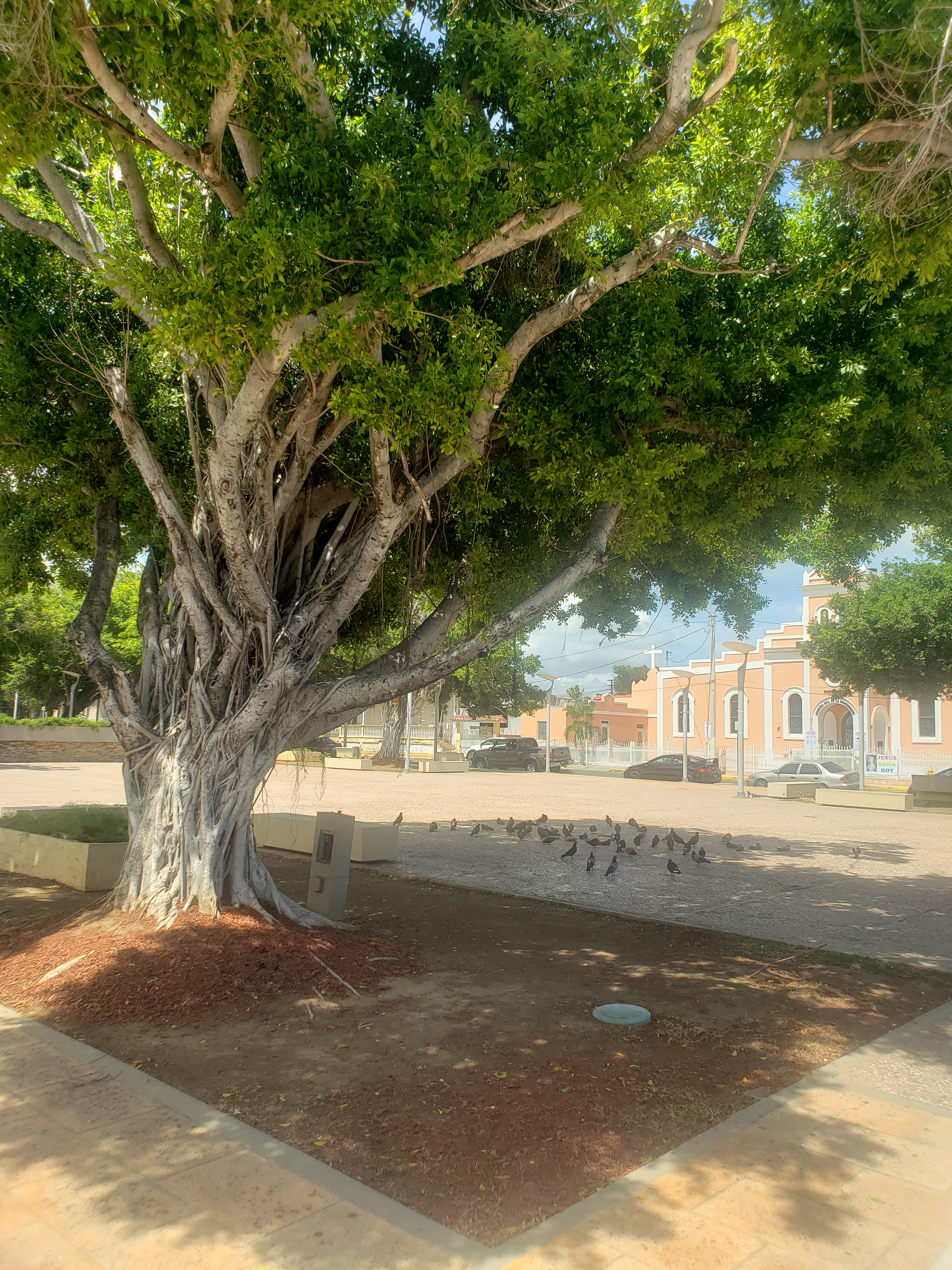
Plaza with the Catholic church in the background.

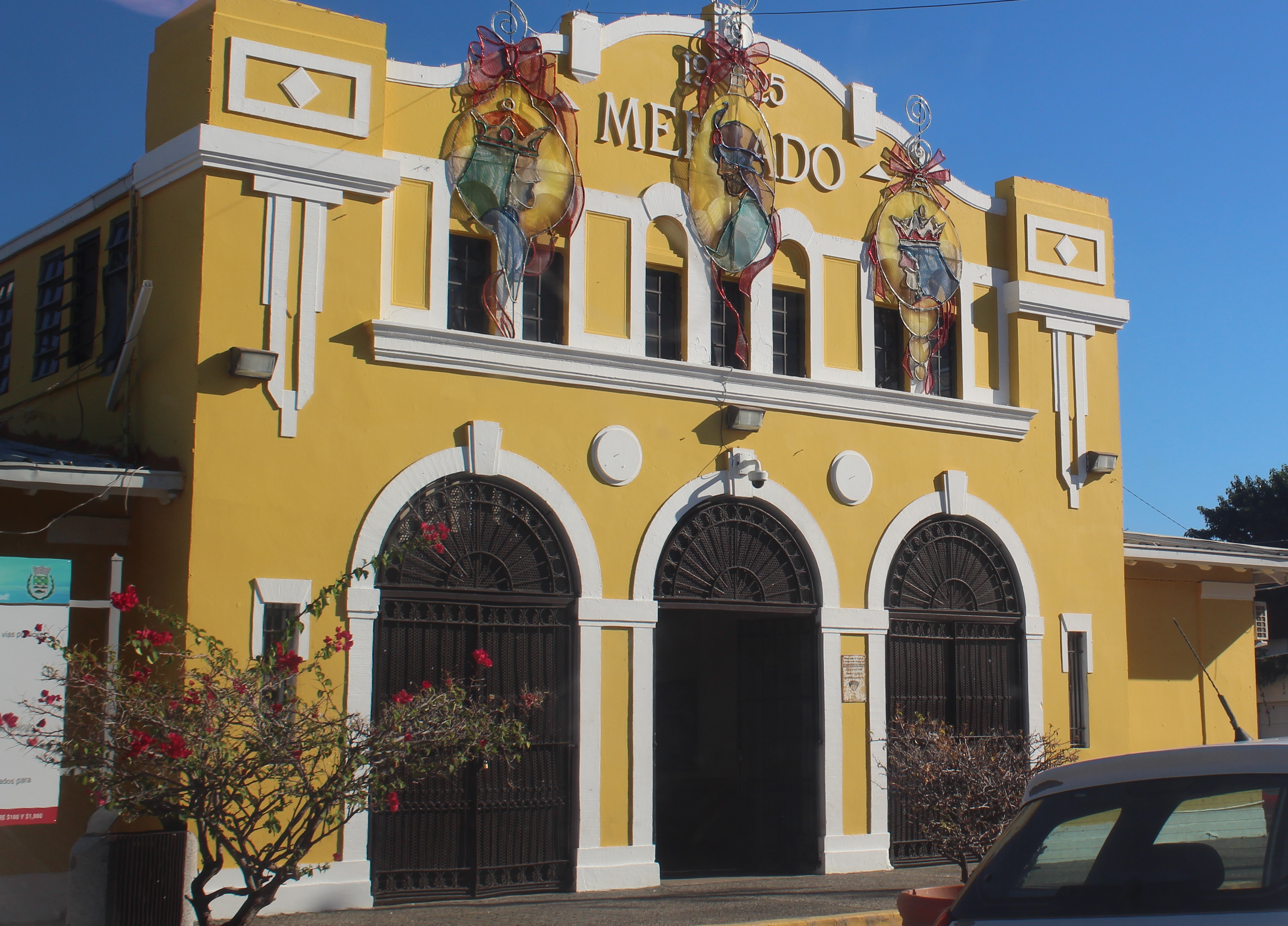
Plaza del Mercado de Salinas during Christmas

== See also ==
- List of communities in Puerto Rico
