= Aguirre, Salinas, Puerto Rico =

Barrio of Puerto Rico

Aguirre
- Barrio
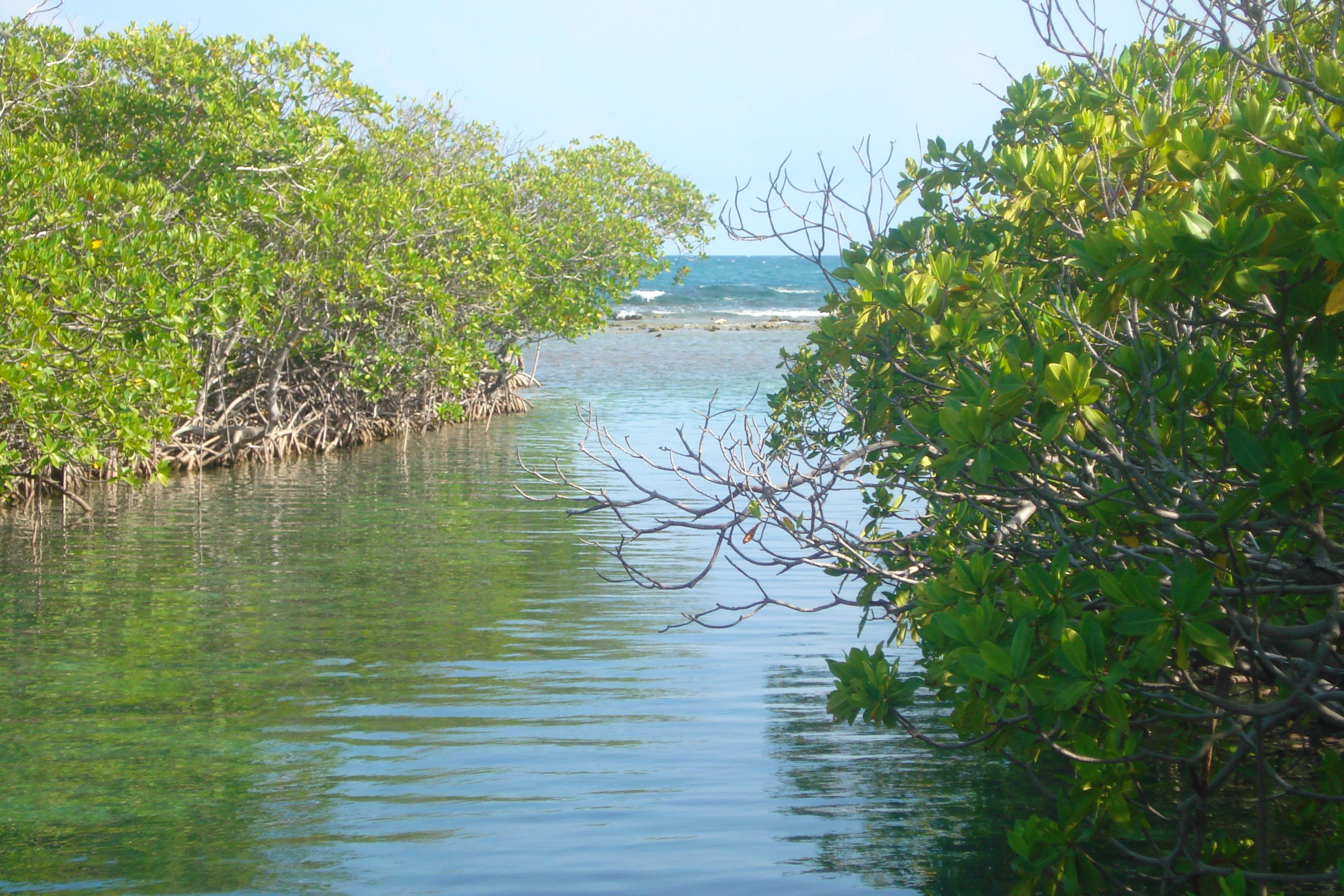
- Cayo Matias

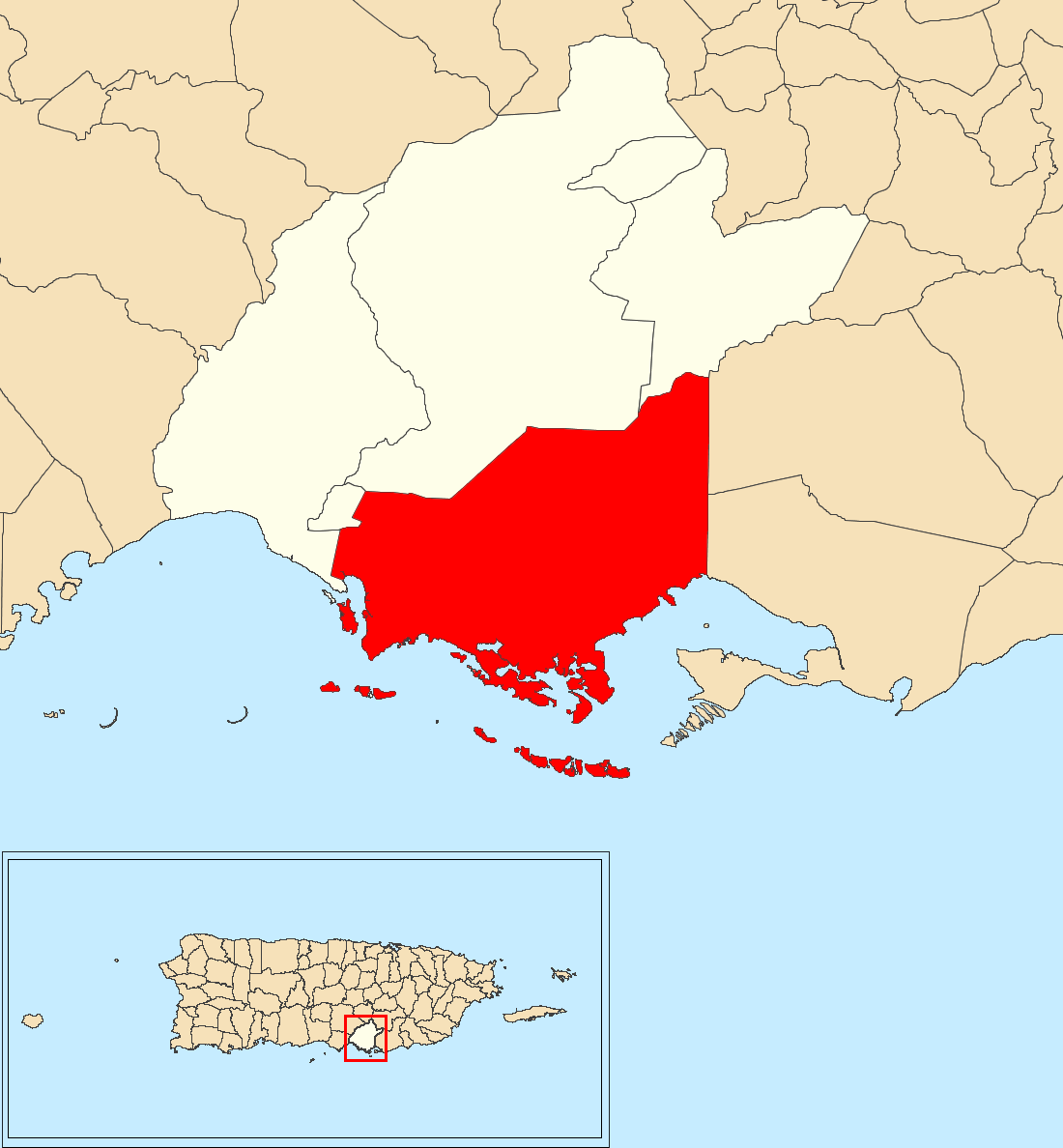
- Location of Aguirre within the municipality of Salinas shown in red

- Location of Puerto Rico
- Coordinates: 17°57′05″N 66°15′01″W
- Commonwealth: Puerto Rico
- Municipality: Salinas

Area
  - Total: 36.22 sq mi (93.8 km^{2})
  - Land: 19.49 sq mi (50.5 km^{2})
  - Water: 16.73 sq mi (43.3 km^{2})
- Elevation: 3 ft (0.91 m)

Population (2010)
  - Total: 14,005
  - Density: 719.3/sq mi (277.7/km^{2})
- Source: 2010 Census
- Time zone: UTC−4 (AST)
- ZIP code: 00704

Aguirre is a barrio in the municipality of Salinas, Puerto Rico. Its population in 2010 was 14,005.

== History ==
Aguirre was in Spain's gazetteers until Puerto Rico was ceded by Spain in the aftermath of the Spanish–American War under the terms of the Treaty of Paris of 1898 and became an unincorporated territory of the United States. In 1899, the United States Department of War conducted a census of Puerto Rico finding that the population of Aguirre barrio was 1,291.

Aguirre was once a municipality, until it was merged into Salinas during the 1990s. Before that, Aguirre was Puerto Rico's smallest municipality, a distinction now held by Cataño near San Juan.

The Central Aguirre Historic District was listed on the U.S. National Register of Historic Places in 2002.

For many years, Aguirre's main economical support came from the Central Azucarera de Aguirre, a local sugar factory. Aguirre still has a "central" but this one is operated by the Autoridad de Energía Eléctrica de Puerto Rico, a government energy company. On Monday, July 25, 2016, there was a fire at the plant when there was an unnoticed petroleum leak. No one was injured, but the central's plants were unworkable for the following three weeks.

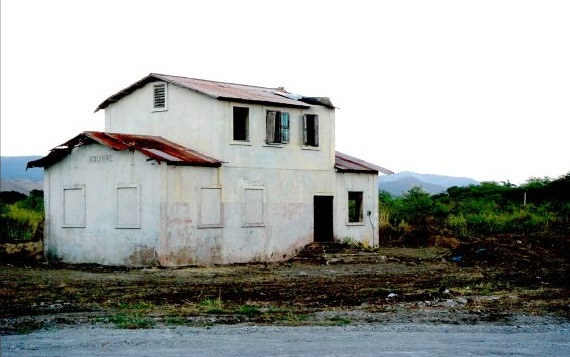
Old building in Aguirre

The Central Azucarera de Aguirre was placed on the 2020 World Monuments Watch by the World Monuments Fund organization. The organization will use the site as a focal educational resource to train people in Puerto Rico on building with wood.

Historical population
Census	Pop.	Note	%±
1900	1,291		—
1910	3,996		209.5%
1920	5,807		45.3%
1930	6,796		17.0%
1940	7,811		14.9%
1950	9,152		17.2%
1960	8,645		−5.5%
1970	0		−100.0%
1980	8,772		—
1990	10,638		21.3%
2000	12,128		14.0%
2010	14,005		15.5%
U.S. Decennial Census; 1899 (shown as 1900) 1910-1930; 1930-1950 1980-2000 2010

== Transportation ==
Aguirre, like the rest of Salinas, is accessible by car and other wheeled vehicles through Puerto Rico Highway 1, which connects the country's two largest cities of San Juan and Ponce. The nearest commercial airport is Mercedita Airport in Ponce, while the nearest airport with multiple international flights is Luis Muñoz Marín International Airport in San Juan.

== See also ==
- List of communities in Puerto Rico
