= Citron (surname) =

Citron is a surname. Notable people with the surname include:

- Bob Citron (1932–2012), American entrepreneur and aerospace engineer
- Danielle Citron, American law professor and author
- Gerry Citron (1935–2005), British footballer
- Jason Citron, software engineer and social media entrepreneur, one of the founders of Discord
- Jeffrey A. Citron, American business executive
- Lana Citron (born 1969), Irish author, poet, and screenwriter
- Marcia Citron (born 1945), American musicologist, educator, and author
- Michelle Citron (fl.1973–present), American feminist studies scholar, film, video, and multimedia artist, and author
- Minna Citron (1896–1991), American painter and printmaker
- Neil Citron, Canadian guitarist
- Pierre Citron (1919–2010), French musicologist, author, and professor
- Robert Citron (1925–2013), American politician, tax collector, money manager, and rogue securities trader
- Sabina Citron (born 1928), Polish-born Canadian activist, author, and Holocaust survivor
- Samuel Leib Zitron (a.k.a. S. L. Citron; 1860–1930), Russian Hebrew and Yiddish writer, translator, historian, and literary critic
- Sloane Citron (born 1956), American magazine publisher
- Sonia Citron (born 2003), Notre Dame women's basketball player
- Stephen Citron (1924–2013), American songwriter, pianist, critic, and biographer
- William M. Citron (1896–1976), American politician and lawyer

== See also ==
- Citroen (surname), a similarly spelled surname
- Citron (disambiguation)
- Robert Citrone (born 1964), American hedge fund manager and corporate-bond analyst
- Zitron, a similarly spelled surname
