= Citronelle =

Citronelle may refer to:

- Citronelle, Alabama, and several related topics:
  - Citronelle High School
  - Citronelle Railroad Historic District
  - Citronelle Walking Trail
  - 2016 Citronelle homicides
- Citronelle Formation, a geological formation in the southeastern United States
- Michel Richard Citronelle, a former restaurant in Washington, D.C.

== See also ==
- Citronella (disambiguation)
