= Cintrón =

Cintrón is a surname. In Puerto Rico and the Dominican Republic, it may have originated as a nickname derived from an abbreviated form of Spanish cinturón 'belt.'

Notable people with the surname include:

- Alex Cintrón (born 1978), Major League Baseball infielder
- Benjamín Cintrón Lebrón, Puerto Rican politician
- Carlos Juan Cintrón (1918–1998), mayor of Ponce, Puerto Rico from 1957 to 1961
- Conchita Cintrón (1922–2009), Chilean torera (female bullfighter)
- Edna Cintrón (1954–2001), victim of the September 11 attacks known as the Waving Woman
- Ivette Cintron, Puerto Rican singer and model
- Jailene Cintrón (born 1966), Puerto Rican singer and TV personality
- James Tuller Cintrón, Puerto Rican police superintendent
- Jeyvier Cintrón (born 1995), Puerto Rican boxer
- José Vicente Ferrer de Otero y Cintrón (1912–1992), Puerto Rican actor, theater and film director
- Juan H. Cintrón García (1919–2012), Puerto Rican politician, Mayor of Ponce 1968–1972
- Kermit Cintrón (born 1979), Puerto Rican boxer
- Manolo Cintrón (born 1963), Puerto Rican professional basketball player
- Manuel Egozcue Cintrón (1855–1906), Basque-born Puerto Rican businessman and politician
- Nemir Matos-Cintrón (born 1949), Puerto Rican author who currently resides in Florida
- Nitza Margarita Cintrón (born 1950), Chief of Space Medicine & Health Care Systems Office at NASA's Johnson Space Center
- Pedro Cintrón, Puerto Rican basketball coach
- Roberto Feliberti Cintrón (born 1963), Puerto Rican judge
- Rosendo Matienzo Cintrón (1855–1913), Puerto Rican lawyer and political leader
- Sharon Cintron (1945–2017), American model and actress
- Wilfredo Mattos Cintrón (born c. 1945), Puerto Rican educator
