= Citron (disambiguation) =

Citron is a species of citrus fruit; citron varieties include:

- Florentine citron
- Diamante citron from Italy
- Greek citron
- Balady citron from Israel
- Fingered citron
- Yemenite citron

== Other uses ==
- Citron (surname)
- Parti Citron, a political party in Canada
- Citron melon
- Citron (color)
- Citron (band), a Czech hard rock/heavy metal band
- Citron (emulator), a Nintendo Switch emulator

== See also ==
- Citronella (disambiguation)
- Citroën
- Cintron
