= José Caldero =

Former Superintendent of the Puerto Rico Police Department

Superintendent of the Puerto Rico Police
- In office 2014–2017
- Governor: Alejandro Garcia Padilla
- Preceded by: James Tuller
- Succeeded by: Michelle Fraley

Commissioner of the San Juan Police Department
- In office 2018–2020
- Appointed by: Carmen Yulin Cruz

Personal details
- Born: Corozal, Puerto Rico
- Education: University of Turabo (MPA); FBI National Academy

José Luis Caldero López (Note: In this Spanish name, the first or paternal surname is Caldero and the second or maternal family name is López.) was a career policeman and appointed Superintendent of the Puerto Rico Police from 2014 to 2017, in the former Governor Alejandro Garcia Padilla Administration.

== Education ==
Caldero López holds a Bachelor's degree in Criminal Justice. He completed his master's degree in public affairs at the University of Turabo. In addition, he is a graduate of the FBI National Academy and the school of hostage negotiators at the FBI Academy in Quantico, Virginia. Also, he holds a degree from the Academy of secret service security to dignitaries in Washington, DC.

== Police Career ==
Caldero began his career in the Puerto Rico Police Department in 1977 as an officer assigned to the Puerto Nuevo Precinct, and he rose through the ranks within the police force until reaching the rank of colonel, distinguishing himself as assistant superintendent in Criminal Investigations and later as director of the Carolina Region. He helped develop the law enforcement policy of the Popular Democratic Party 2012 platform. In 2014 governor Alejandro Garcia Padilla appointed José Caldero as Superintendent of the Puerto Rico Police. José Caldero retired from the Puerto Rico Police in 2017. In 2018 José Caldero was named commissioner of the San Juan Police Department by the mayor of San Juan, Puerto Rico Hon.Carmen Yulin Cruz. He held the position until 2020.

== Notes ==
Police appointments
Preceded by James Tuller	Superintendent of the Puerto Rico Police; 2014-2017	Succeeded by Michelle Fraley
