= Victor Rivera =

Victor Rivera may refer to:

- Victor Rivera (bishop) (1916–2005), American Episcopalian bishop
- Víctor Rivera (judoka) (born 1965), Puerto Rican judoka
- Víctor Rivera (wrestler) (born 1944), Puerto Rican professional wrestler
- Víctor Rivera (football manager) (born 1968), Peruvian football manager
- Víctor Rivera (volleyball) (born 1976), Puerto Rican volleyball player
- Víctor Hugo Rivera (born 1967), Peruvian football referee

== See also ==
- Víctor Rivera González (born 1948), Puerto Rican attorney and former Secretary of Corrections and Chief of Police
