= Superintendent of the Puerto Rico Police =

Highest-ranking officer, administrator, and director of the Puerto Rico Police

- Incumbent; Joseph González since July 30, 2025
- Puerto Rico Police
- Reports to: Commissioner of Safety and Public Protection
- Nominator: Governor of Puerto Rico
- Appointer: Governor of Puerto Rico with the advice and consent from the Senate
- Term length: 4 years
- Formation: 1956-2017, 2025- present

The Superintendent of the Puerto Rico Police (Spanish: Superintendente de la Policía de Puerto Rico) is the highest-ranking officer, administrator, and director of the Puerto Rico Police, and an ex officio member of the Commission on Safety and Public Protection as well. The superintendent is appointed by the governor of Puerto Rico with advice and consent from the Senate. Superintendents have also typically being simultaneously appointed as Commissioners of Safety and Public Protection due to the nature of their job and experience.

The rank of Superintendent has existed since 1952; Before that, from 1899 to 1956, the rank was known as Chief of the Puerto Rico Police.

== Chiefs of Police ==
#	Portrait	Name	Date it took office	Date it left office	Appointed by
1		Frank Techner	February 21, 1899	May 1, 1900	
2		Terrence Hamill	May 1, 1900		
3		William Stuz			
4		George R. Shanton	1909	1922	
5		William R. Rennett			
6		G.W. Lewis	1923	1930	
7		Elisha Francis Riggs	October 3, 1933	February 23, 1936	Blanton Winship
8		Luis R. Esteves	February 27, 1936		Blanton Winship
9		Enrique Orbeta	June 2, 1936		Blanton Winship
10		Antonio R. Silva			
11		Luis Ramirez Brau			
12		Joshua Jellinger			
13		Salvador T. Roig	1946		Rexford Tugwell

== Superintendents ==
#	Portrait	Name	Date it took office	Date it left office	Appointed by
1		Ramón Torres Braschi	1956	1963	Luis Muñoz Marín
2		Salvador T. Roig	1963	1966	Luis Muñoz Marín
3		Salvador Rodriguez Aponte	1966	1968	Roberto Sánchez Vilella
4		Luis Torres Massa	1969	1972	Luis A. Ferré
5		Astol Calero Toledo			
6		Luis Maldonado Trinidad			
7		Roberto Torres Gonzalez			Carlos Romero Barceló
8		Desiderio Cartagena Ortiz			Carlos Romero Barceló
9		Jorge Collazo Torres			
10		Andres Garcia Arache			Rafael Hernández Colón
11		Carlos J. Lopez Feliciano	1985	1989	Rafael Hernández Colón
12		Ismael Betancourt Lebron	1989	1992	Rafael Hernández Colón
13		Pedro Toledo Davila	January 2, 1993	January 1, 2001	Pedro Rosselló
14		Pierre Vivoni Del Valle	January 2, 2001	May 13, 2002	Sila María Calderón
15		Miguel Pereira Castillo	May 14, 2002	November 1, 2003	Sila María Calderón
16		Victor Rivera Gonzalez	November 2, 2002	March 2003	Sila María Calderón
17		Agustin Cartagena Diaz	March 2003	January 1, 2005	Sila María Calderón
18		Pedro Toledo	January 2, 2005	January 1, 2009	Aníbal Acevedo Vilá
19		Jose Figueroa Sancha	January 2, 2009	July 2, 2011	Luis Fortuño
20		José Luis Rivera	July 3, 2011	July 6, 2011	Luis Fortuño
21		Emilio Díaz Colón	July 7, 2011	March 28, 2012	Luis Fortuño
22		Héctor Pesquera	March 29, 2012	November 30, 2013	Luis Fortuño
23		James Tuller	December 1, 2013	March 31, 2014	Alejandro García Padilla
24		Juan B. Rodríguez	April 1, 2014	April 4, 2014	Alejandro García Padilla
25		José Caldero	April 4, 2014	December 31, 2016	Alejandro García Padilla
26		Michelle Hernandez Frailey	January 2, 2017	January 8, 2018	Ricardo Rosselló Nevarez
27		Joseph González	July 30, 2025	present	Jenniffer González

== Commissioners ==
#	Portrait	Name	Date it took office	Date it left office	Appointed by
1		Michelle Hernandez Frailey	January 2, 2017	January 8, 2018	Ricardo Rosselló Nevarez
2		Henry Escalera	January 8, 2018	December 31, 2020	Ricardo Rosselló Nevarez
3		Antonio López Figueroa	April 6, 2021	February 10, 2025	Pedro Pierluisi
4		Joseph González Falcón	February 10, 2025	Present	Jenniffer González
