= Citroen (surname) =

Citroen or Citroën is a surname. It may refer to:

- André Citroën (1878–1935), French industrialist and automotive designer, manufacturer, and pioneer
- Cosman Citroen (1881–1935), Dutch architect
- Paul Citroen (1896–1983), German-born Dutch artist and educator

== See also ==
- Citroën, French automobile manufacturing company founded by André Citroën
- Citron (surname), a similarly spelled surname
