= Citronelle Walking Trail =

Rail trail in Citronelle, Alabama, US

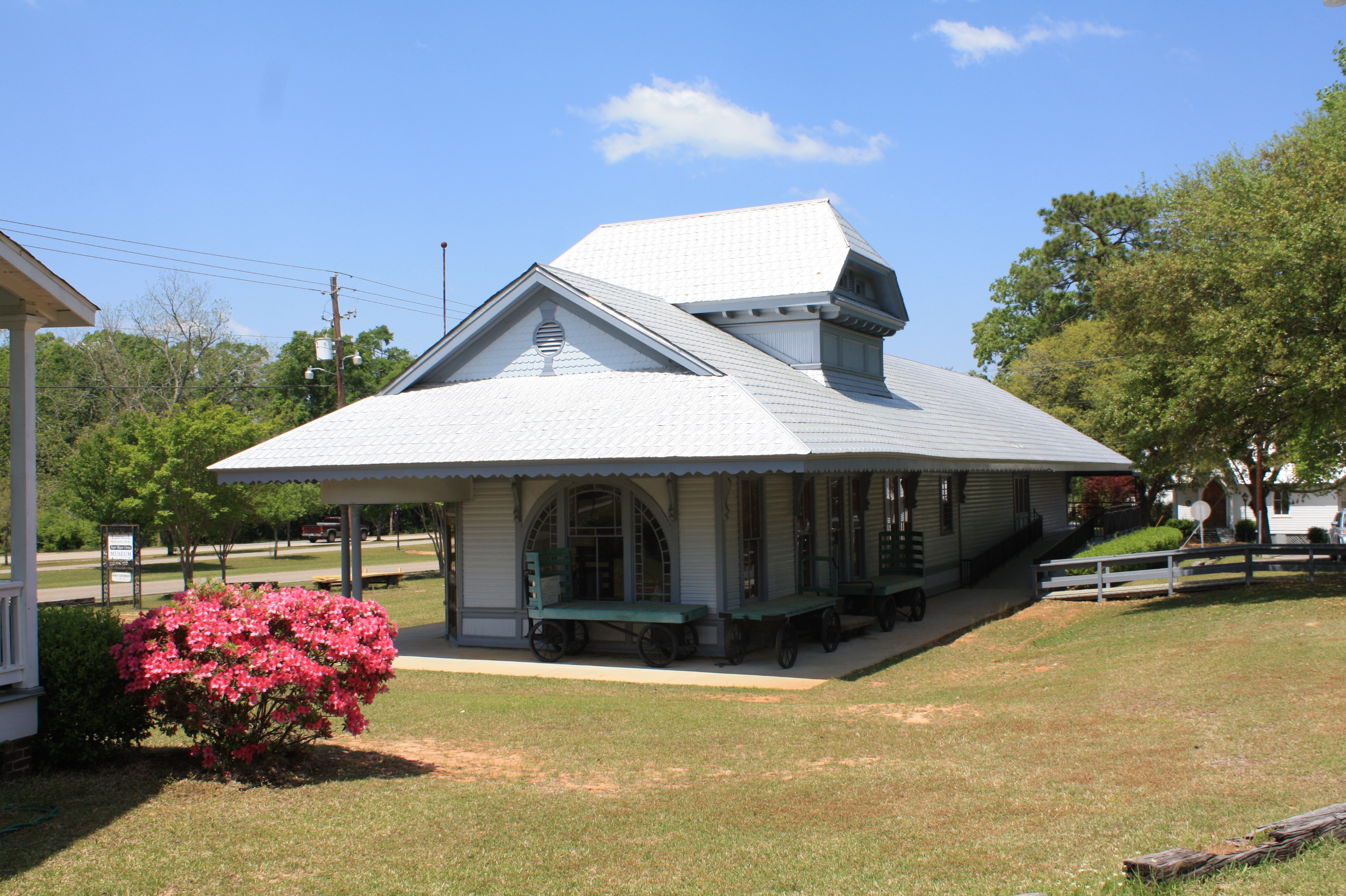
- Mobile and Ohio Railroad depot, located along the trail, which can be seen in the background
- Length: 3 miles (4.8 km)
- Location: Citronelle, Alabama
- Designation: National Recreation Trail
- Use: Skating, hiking
- Highest point: 347 feet (106 m)
- Lowest point: 323 feet (98 m)
- Grade: 1%

The Citronelle Walking Trail is a three-mile long, asphalt-covered rail trail in Citronelle, Alabama. It was designated as a National Recreation Trail in 2011.

== History ==
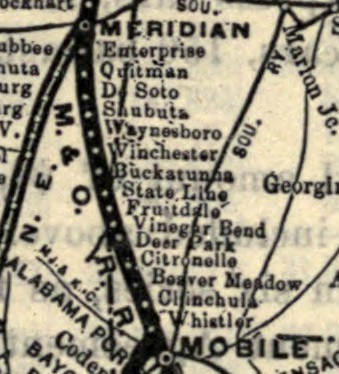
1903 Mobile and Ohio Railroad map featuring the route from Meridian to Mobile

The route was created by the Mobile and Ohio Railroad in 1852. The 30-mile stretch from Citronelle to Mobile was the first section of the railroad to be open for service. The railroad was a major contributor to the growth of the town, as the railroads promoted it as a health resort because of its mineral springs and altitude. Though the route underwent many transfers of ownership, it was eventually abandoned. It was then converted into a paved trail. It received grants from the Recreational Trails Program to develop the trail and to install gas lights along the trail. The trail was designated as a National Recreation Trail on June 2, 2011.

== Route description ==
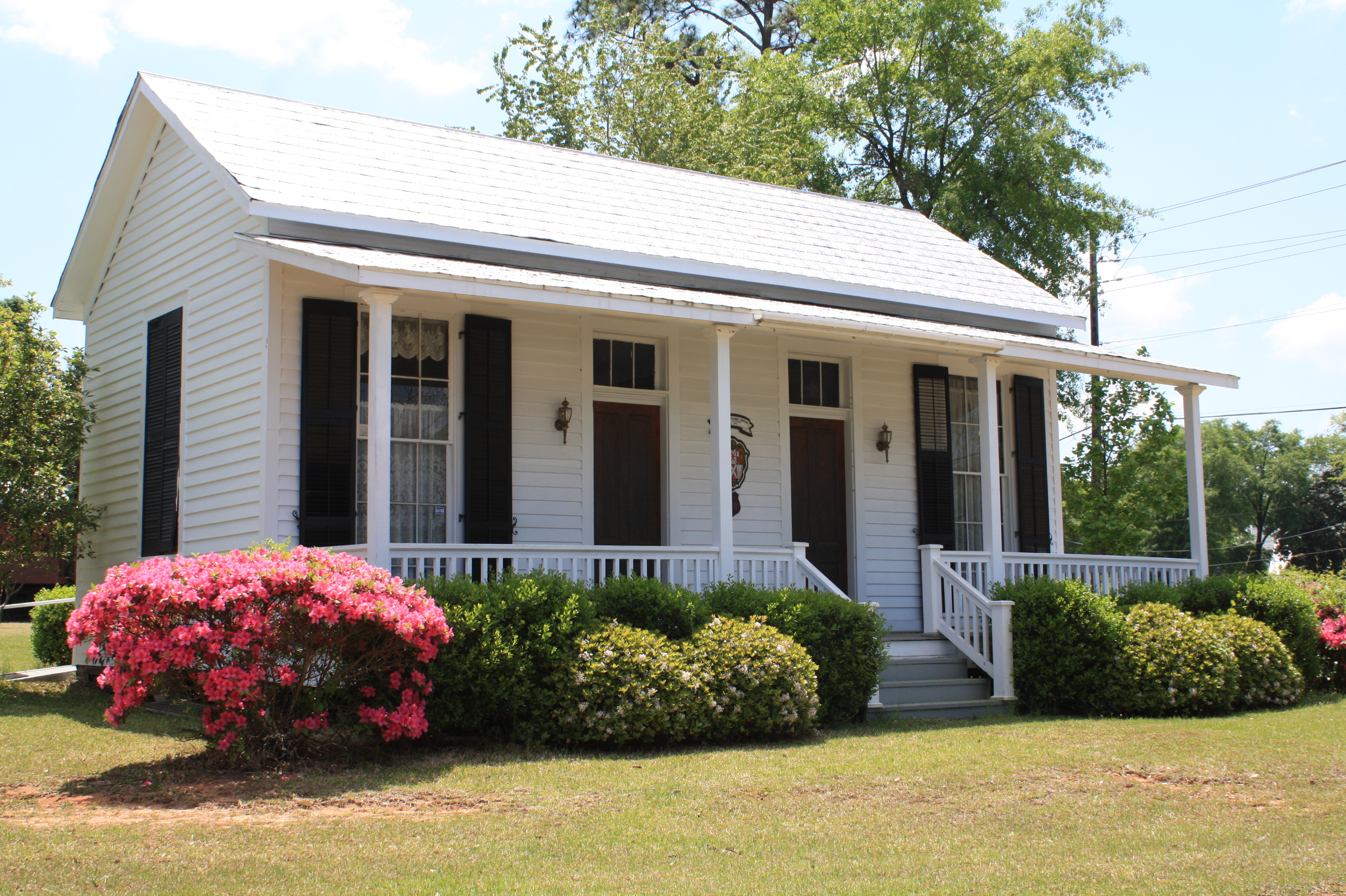
Hygeia Hotel Cottage

The trail begins in Newberry Crossing, in the center of Citronelle. It heads south from there and ends just before reaching a connection between U.S. Route 45 and Celeste Road. Along the way, the trail passes through the Citronelle Railroad Historic District. This includes a restored train depot, which was built in 1903 and currently serves as a museum. Also within the district is the Hygeia Cottage, a part of the town's Hygeia Hotel. The cottage is the only remnant of the hotels built during the town's tourism boom due to its marketing as a health resort.
