= Ramón Torres Braschi =

First Superintendent of the Puerto Rico Police

Superintendent of the Puerto Rico Police
- In office 1956–1963
- Appointed by: Luis Muñoz Marín
- Preceded by: Joshua Jellinger
- Succeeded by: Salvador T. Roig

Personal details
- Born: October 18, 1917 Ponce, Puerto Rico
- Died: September 13, 1983 (65) San Juan, Puerto Rico
- Education: University of Puerto Rico (BBA)

Military service
- Allegiance: United States of America
- Branch/service: United States Army
- Years of service: 1940–1946
- Rank: Captain
- Unit: 65th Infantry Regiment
- Battles/wars: World War II

Ramón Torres Braschi (October 18, 1917 – September 13, 1983) was the first Puerto Rico Police Superintendent, acting from 1956 to March 14, 1963. Before this commission, he had been director of the Office of Personnel of Puerto Rico. He also served in the United States Army with the rank of captain. He was a member of Phi Sigma Alpha fraternity. During his tenure as Puerto Rico Police Superintendent, Torres Braschi received an award from the American Society of Public Administration (Puerto Rico chapter) for the establishment of the preventive and permanent surveillance system. He presented his resignation as Puerto Rico Police Superintendent to accept an academic appointment as professor at the University of Puerto Rico. Ramón Torres Braschi died on September 13, 1983, at age 65, He was buried at the Puerto Rico National Cemetery in Bayamón, Puerto Rico.

He served in the National Guard and the U.S. Army. He was a public official in the Government of Puerto Rico, serving first as assistant director and then as chief personnel officer. He was the first superintendent of the Police of the Commonwealth of Puerto Rico. He was also a lecturer and associate professor at the Graduate School of Public Administration of the University of Puerto Rico and a lawyer in private practice from 1964 to 1983, the year in which he died. He was married since 1947 to Mayaguez-born Mrs. Hilda Irizarry Mercader.

== Early life ==
Ramón Torres Braschi was born in Ponce on October 18, 1917, the youngest son of Prosecuting attorney Libertad Torres Grau and Mrs. Aida Braschi Paoli. Ramón grew up in Ponce, Yauco, and Santurce. He completed his first years of grade school education in the latter, graduating from Matienzo Elementary School in 1930 and the Santurce Central High School in 1934.

== Military service (1940–1946) ==
Torres Braschi voluntarily enlisted in the United States National Guard based in Puerto Rico, which was about to be federalized in 1940. In May 1942, he was commissioned as an Infantry Second Lieutenant in the United States Army after graduating from the United States Army Officer Candidate School) (OCS) at Fort Benning, Georgia. In 1944, he was assigned to the Third Battalion of the 65th Infantry Regiment, serving in several countries, including France and Germany. His unit saw action at Peira Cava in the French Maritime Alps. He was released from active duty in 1946, having reached the rank of captain. His service records indicate credit for campaigns at the European theatre of war in Rhineland, Rome-Arno and Central Europe and four decorations: American Defense Service Medal (with 4 bronze stars); European–African–Middle Eastern Campaign Medal; American Campaign Medal; and the World War II Victory Medal.

== Office of Personnel Commonwealth of Puerto Rico (1947–1956) ==
In 1946, he completed his studies at the University of Puerto Rico (UPR) graduating with a bachelor's degree in commercial administration (BBA) (cum laude). He began working at the University as its first director of the Personnel Office (now Human Resources). In 1947, he resigned to accept an appointment as deputy director of the Office of Personnel of the Government of Puerto Rico. The Office was then of recent creation and managed by Don Manuel A. Pérez. In 1951, Torres Braschi applied for a leave to study the Master's Degree in Personnel Administration (MPA) at Harvard University's Graduate School of Public Administration. Upon his return to Puerto Rico and after the death of Don Manuel A. Pérez in 1951, Torres Braschi served as interim Chief Personnel Officer until he was formally appointed to the post in 1952.

== Superintendent of the Puerto Rico Police (1956–1963) ==
In July 1956 he was appointed first superintendent of the Puerto Rico Police by then governor of Puerto Rico, Don Luis Muñoz Marín, thereby becoming the first civil servant to manage that institution. Among the most notable events during his tenure were visits to Puerto Rico by U.S. Presidents Dwight D. Eisenhower in February 1960, and John F. Kennedy in December 1961.

Torres Braschi was in charge of the police until 1963, when he resigned for health reasons. The April 1963 editorial column of Public Order (known in Puerto Rico as the publication Orden Publico) magazine summarized his main achievements in the PR Police as follows:

... Under the leadership of Torres Braschi, programming related to new standards in public service was intensified in all its aspects; education and prevention work was expanded through the existing youth institutions in the Corps; preferential attention was given to civic activities, as well as communication agencies consisting of press, radio and others; great emphasis was placed on the promotion of human and social relations in general; due recognition of the efficiency and dedication in the service of the members of the Corps; due attention was paid to the retired members of the institution, especially in support of the institutions created by them for their protection. Mr. Torres Braschi also imprinted great human sense on all procedures related to the mission of our police agency, disassociating himself, as far as possible in an armed body, from the sordid and mechanistic aspect of the military organizations, whose mission does not go beyond, as is the case in the police forces in their functional process, to direct service to citizens for their defense and individual protection ...

== Professor and lawyer (1963–1983) ==
Since 1951, Torres Braschi had been associated to the UPR Graduate School of Public Administration, initially as an ad honorem lecturer. In 1963 he returned as a lecturer until becoming an associate professor.

In 1960 he began studying law in the first night school section of the UPR School of Law, receiving his Bachelor of Laws (LL.B.) (magna cum laude) in 1964. He practiced the law profession specializing in the areas of civil law, tax, corporations, and contracts.

He was also an ad hoc consultant on personnel administration issues for the governments of El Salvador, Honduras, and the Dominican Republic. He was an honorary member of several organizations, including the International Association of Chiefs of Police, the Police Association, and the Puerto Rico Police Veterans Association.

== See also ==
- List of superintendents of the Puerto Rico Police

Police appointments
| Preceded by Joshua Jellinger | Superintendent of the Puerto Rico Police; 1956-1963 | Succeeded by Salvador T. Roig |
