= Ismael Betancourt Lebron =

Former superintendent of the Puerto Rico Police Department

Superintendent of the Puerto Rico Police
- In office 1989–1992
- Governor: Rafael Hernández Colón
- Preceded by: Carlos J. Lopez Feliciano
- Succeeded by: Pedro Toledo

Personal details
- Born: July 27, 1930 San Sebastián, Puerto Rico
- Died: June 6, 2014 (aged 83) Santurce, Puerto Rico
- Occupation: lawyer

Ismael Betancourt Lebrón (July 27, 1930 - June 5, 2014) was a Puerto Rican lawyer when he joined the public service in the newly established Commonwealth in 1956. He was district attorney in San Juan and Bayamón. He was superintendent for the Puerto Rico Police Department between 1989 and 1992, during the governorship of Rafael Hernández Colón.

== Puerto Rico Police Department ==
During his time in the police, among other initiatives, it amended the regulation of police recruitment to include two psychological tests and one polygraph test for applicants. Betancourt Lebrón defended increased academic levels to enter the police and favored the professionalization of the Puerto Rico Police.

== Death ==
He died on June 5, 2014 at the age of 83, while been hospitalized at Pavia Hospital in Santurce, Puerto Rico due to a heart arrest. He was buried at Cementerio Borinquen Memorial in Caguas, Puerto Rico.

== See also ==
- List of superintendents of the Puerto Rico Police

Police appointments
Preceded by Carlos J. Lopez Feliciano	Superintendent of the Puerto Rico Police; 1989–1993	Succeeded by Pedro Toledo
