= Universidad Ana G. Méndez =

Private space-grant university in Puerto Rico

- Universidad Ana G. Mendez (UAGM)
- Former names: Puerto Rico Junior College Association; Sistema Universitario Ana G. Méndez
- Motto: Studium est lux
- Motto in English: Light of enlightenment
- Type: Private university
- Established: 1941; 85 years ago
- Academic affiliations: Space-grant
- Chairman: Félix Rodríguez Schmidt
- President: José F. Méndez Méndez
- President Emeritus: José F. Méndez González
- Students: 24,700
- Location: San Juan, Puerto Rico
- Colours: Crimson and white
- Website: uagm.edu
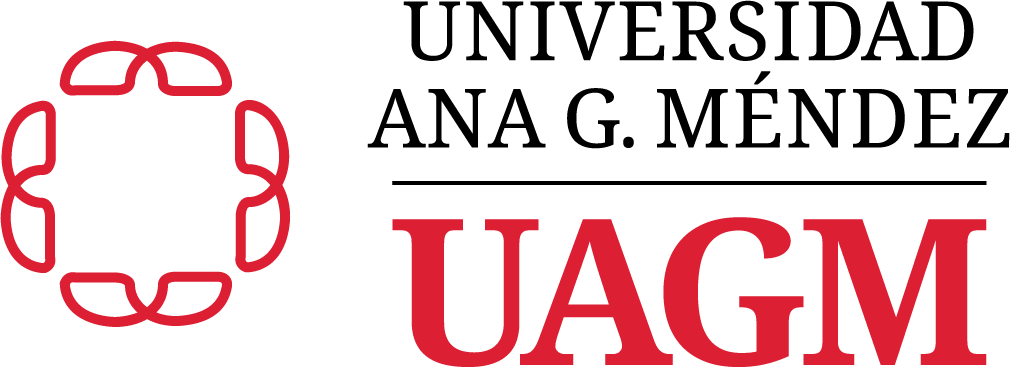

The Universidad Ana G. Méndez (UAGM) is a private university system with its main campus in San Juan, Puerto Rico that participates in the Puerto Rico Space Grant Consortium.

== History ==
=== Creation ===
In 1941, Ana G. Mendez, Alfredo Muñiz Souffront, and Florencio Pagán Cruz founded Puerto Rico High School of Commerce (PRHSC) in Rio Piedras.

In 1949, the Puerto Rico Junior College (PRJC) was established in Cupey. It became the first college to offer two-year degrees in Puerto Rico. The PRHSC was later renamed to PRJC, and the Puerto Rico Junior College Association was created to oversee its campuses.

In 1949, it received accreditation from the Middle States Association of Colleges and Secondary Schools, with an enrollment of 820 students.

After much expansion during the 60s with new buildings like a Student Center in Cupey Campus and enrollment of 2700 students across the two schools, in 1968, the PRJC established its third campus in Valle del Turabo in Gurabo, with an initial enrollment of 207 students.

After the inauguration of the Gurabo Campus in 1968, the Puerto Rico Junior College Association decided to change its name to the Ana G. Méndez Educational Foundation.

The Gurabo Campus changed its name to Colegio Universitario del Turabo in 1972, as it started to offer bachelor's degrees. The next year, a program of Doctorate in Education was created, a collaboration between the foundation and the University of Nova.

On 25 August 1974, Ana G. Mendez resigned from the Board of Directors of the Foundation. On 26 September of the same year, the Foundation named Jose F. Mendez Gonzalez as President.

During the 70s, the system was growing; by 1975, the enrollment in the PRJC was 5,691, and the enrollment in the Universidad del Turabo was at 4,445. It created multiple programs, such as the Centro de Estudios Televisados (CET), which served people who couldn't get to the university campus. In 1979, the Master Institutional Plan was created, which itself created plans for new campuses of PRJC and Turabo, and also the creation of another university that could offer bachelor's degrees.

=== Expansion ===
In 1980, the PRJC Cupey Campus was changed into the Colegio Universitario Metropolitano, becoming the second campus that offered bachelor's degrees in the system.

In 1981, the Colegio Universitario del Turabo started to offer graduate programs, and changed its name to Universidad del Turabo (most commonly known as Turabo).

In 1983, Middle States accredited it the Special Educational Service Program or Programa de Servicios Educativos Especiales in Spanish and received the Program Excellence from the National University Continuing Education Association.

In 1985, the Colegio Universitario Metropolitano changed its name to the Universidad Metropolitana or UMET. It also inaugurated the Jayuya Campus by PROSEE. Also, the PRJC inaugurated the Cabo Rojo Campus and Coamo Campus. In March of the same year, the system inaugurated Canal 40 (WMTJ-TV), with the CET program, it had classes through the program that started on the 22 of April, with 112 students.

In 1986, UMET inaugurated a new campus in Aguadilla through PROSEE. Turabo also inaugurated a new campus in Yauco, and PRJC also did in Yabucoa.

In 1987, the Foundation became the first private university institution to collaborate in an agreement with the University of Puerto Rico. Also, Turabo inaugurated a campus in Cayey.

In 1988, UMET started to offer master's degrees.

In 1990, PRJC Rio Piedras moved to a new campus in Carolina and in 1992, changes their name to Colegio Universitario del Este (CUE).

In 1991, Turabo estableshes their School of Engineering.

On the 15 of July 1993, the Board of Directors decided to legally change the Foundation to the Fundación Educativa Ana G. Méndez, Inc. From then on, the system came to be known as Sistema Universitario Ana G. Méndez or SUAGM.

In 1995, UMET was selected as a Model of Excellence from the National Science Foundation.

In 31 of July 1996, with the Puerto Rico Tourism Company and the Colegio Universitario del Este, the International School of Tourism and Hotel Administration was established.

In 1998, Turabo inaugurated a new campus in Manati, which later moved to Barceloneta.

In 2001, Turabo estableshes their first online master's program in the School of Business.

In 2002, UMET inaugurated a new campus in Bayamon. In the same year, Turabo inaugurates a new campus in Isabela.

In 2003, SUAGM inaugurated their first campus in the Continental United States in Metro Orlando in Florida, this campus and all campuses in the United States, are branch of all three major universities (UMET, Turabo and Colegio Universitario del Este).

In 2005, Turabo inaugurated a campus in Ponce.

In 2006, SUAGM inaugurated the second campus in South Florida because of the high Hispanic population.

In 2010, SUAGM inaugurated a campus in Tampa Bay.

In 2012, SUAGM inaugurated the Capital Area Campus in Maryland.

In 2013, SUAGM estableshed their online campus.

In 2015, SUAGM established a campus in Dallas.

In 2016, the Board of Directors named Sr. Jose F Méndez González as president emeritus and the President of SUAGM.

In 2021, SUAGM established a new university in Florida, Ana G. Méndez University (AGMU), licensed by the Florida Commission for Independent Education (CIE). The university operates one main campus, the Metro Orlando Campus (MOC), two additional locations in Tampa Bay and South Florida, and an Online Division.

=== Restructuring and Unification ===
On January 2, 2019, Metropolitan University, University of Turabo and Universidad del Este merged into a single university of campuses to form Universidad Ana G. Méndez.

In early 2020, the Yauco Campus was permanently closed because of the conditions of the campus after the 2019–20 Puerto Rico earthquakes. Later, it was announced that the Maryland campus was also getting closed because of the restructiring and the unification.

In January 2021, it was announced that the Isabela campus would also be closed because of the restructuring and the unification.

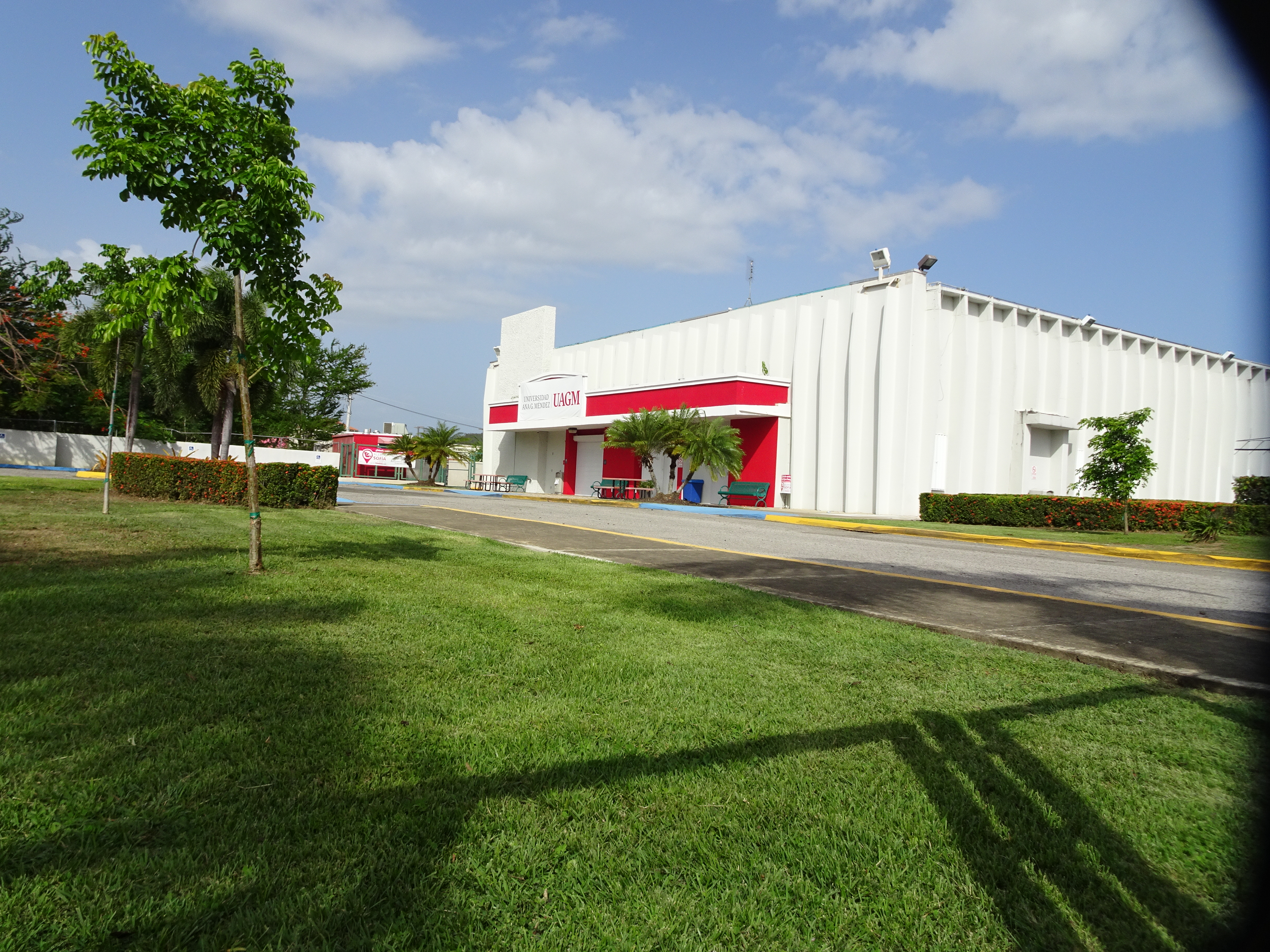
Universidad Ana G. Méndez in Ponce, Puerto Rico

On December 15, 2023, the American Veterinary Association (AVMA) Council on Higher Education (COE) granted UAGM, Gurabo Campus' Doctor of Veterinary Medicine program a Letter of Reasonable Assurance, authorizing the School of Veterinary Medicine to admit the first cohort for the first, and only, degree of Doctor of Veterinary Medicine in the history of Puerto Rico. If the university meet the council's reasonable assurance performance standards, the AVMA-COE will grant the university's School of Veterinary Medicine Provisional Accreditation status, allowing graduates from the first cohort and all others thereafter to sit for the International Council for Veterinary Assessment (ICVA) North America Veterinary Licensing Examination (NAVLE).

The first 80-student cohort's White Coat Ceremony was held on Saturday, September 28, 2024, on the premises of the School of Veterinary Medicine and future Veterinary Teaching Hospital grounds at UAGM, Gurabo campus.

== Campuses ==
The Ana G. Méndez system (SUAGM) has campuses in the following cities in Puerto Rico and the mainland United States.

=== Universidad Ana G. Méndez (Puerto Rico) ===
Campus	Former name	Location	Satellite Campus	Refs
Cupey Campus	Universidad Metropolitana	San Juan, PR		
Gurabo Campus	Universidad del Turabo	Gurabo, PR		
Carolina Campus	Universidad del Este	Carolina, PR		
Ponce Campus		Ponce, PR	Gurabo Campus	
Cabo Rojo Campus		Cabo Rojo, PR	Carolina Campus	
Barceloneta Campus		Barceloneta, PR	Gurabo Campus	
Aguadilla Campus		Aguadilla, PR	Cupey Campus	
Santa Isabel Campus		Santa Isabel, PR	Carolina Campus	
Bayamon Campus		Bayamon, PR	Cupey Campus	
Jayuya Campus		Jayuya, PR	Cupey Campus	
Yabucoa Campus		Yabucoa, PR	Gurabo Campus	
Cayey Campus		Cayey, PR	Gurabo Campus	

=== Ana G. Méndez University (Florida) ===
Campus	Main location	Location	Notes	Refs
Metro Orlando Campus (MOC)	Main Campus	Orlando, FL		
Metro Orlando Campus Online Division	MOC	Online		
South Florida Campus (SFC)	MOC	Miami Lakes, FL	University Center	
Tampa Bay Campus (TBC)	MOC	Tampa Bay, FL	University Center	

=== Former Campuses ===
Campus	Year of Shutdown	Location	Satellite Campus	Reason	Refs
Yauco Campus	2019	Yauco, PR	Carolina Campus	Structural Building Issues	
Isabela Campus	2021	Isabela, PR	Gurabo Campus	Restructiring and Unification	
Capital Area Campus	2020	Wheaton, MD		Restructiring and Unification	
Dallas Area Campus	2020	Dallas, TX		Restructiring and Unification	

=== Gurabo campus (formally University of Turabo) ===
Universidad Ana G. Méndez, Recinto de Gurabo
- Former names: Puerto Rico Junior College; Colegio Universitario del Turabo; Universidad del Turabo
- Motto: Pensar es Crear la Luz de la Vida
- Motto in English: Thinking is Creating the Light of Life
- Type: Private University
- Established: 1972; 54 years ago
- Rector: Zoraida Ortiz Muñoz
- Faculty: 150 full-time
- Administrative staff: 200 adjunct professors
- Students: 16,000
- Undergraduates: 13,000
- Location: Gurabo, Puerto Rico; 18.242406°N 66.0085°W
- Campus: 140 acres (main campus)
- Colors
- Nickname: El Turabo
- Mascot: Taínos (from Taíno)
- Website: gurabo.uagm.edu

The Gurabo campus, formally Universidad del Turabo or more commonly known as "el Turabo" was established in 1972. In 1974 it earned accreditation from the Middle States Association of Colleges and Schools and the Puerto Rico Higher Education Council.

In 2004, it began the doctoral program in Environmental Sciences and the advent of the Strategic Plan for Scientific Research. Today, enrollment exceeds 15,000 students of which over 450 are doctoral level.

In 2018, the National Science Foundation announced a partnership between the University of Turabo and the Cornell High Energy Synchrotron Source at Cornell University (CHESS).

It offered academic studies from technical certificates to doctorates degrees in seven schools: Engineering, Science and Technology, Health Sciences, Education, Business and Administration, Design and Architecture, and Social Sciences.

The Gurabo campus consists of two central campuses —main and Navarro— alongside a series of island-wide satellite campuses. The main campus covers 140 acres (57 ha) with a diversity of open spaces, malls, modern and historic structures, and a healthy distribution of amphitheatre-and-boutique common study/collaborative/collective spaces/areas. The university also hosts a comprehensive sports programme complete with its respective gymnasia, weight room, track & field arena, 25-metre (82 ft) swimming pool, baseball fields, tennis complex, basketball and volleyball courts, and a series of fountains and gardens to elevate enlightenment to the fullest — "Había sequía en el Turabo y ahora se acabó la sequía. Ganamos". The campus' academic offering is organized across seven academic divisions:

- Liberal Arts
- Health Sciences
- Science and Technology
- Engineering, Design & Architecture
- Naturopathic Medicine
- School of Veterinary Medicine
- Business, Tourism & Entrepreneurship

==== Museums and libraries ====
The central university library is located at the main campus in Abelardo Díaz Alfaro Hall. It hosts the campus' central repository and circulation of information both analogue and digital, distributed over the structure with two computing centres spanning the main floor. The Vice-chancellorship of Information Resources is located on the building's upper east side, the stairways leading to the top floor midway canvasing the entire width and wide reflecting the history culture and soul of Cariba's society. Also on the upper floor there are five special collections reading rooms altogether encompassing: The Edgardo Rodríguez Juliá Room, Francisco Manrique Cabrera Room, García Passalacqua-Acosta Room, Ivonne Acosta Lespier Room, and José Luis González Room. From time to time, Abelardo Díaz Alfaro Hall propagates its walls with exhibitions from faculty and students alike. The works of David Méndez Pagán, the current rector, have been exhibited in Abelardo Díaz Alfaro's hall.

There is a library-museum named after the former governor of Puerto Rico, Pedro Rosselló, as "Biblioteca Museo Dr. Pedro Rosselló", which includes a museum, library, studying area, and an auditorium. Of the most memorable items curated at the museum is the Governor's laptop, on whose keypads he redacted many of his diligent works.

There are also two museums within the Centre for Humanistic Studies on the campus' southwest end. On the top floor, a museum of anthropology and archeology curating and hosting exhibitions of archeological historical artifacts. But perhaps the most precious item in the collection is Ana G. Méndez desk, exhibited in the central room of the first floor.

==== Puerto Rico Energy Centre (PREC) ====
The Puerto Rico energy center is dedicated to advancing Puerto Rico's energy efficiency and clean energy use through research, technology transfer, education and demonstration. Its mission is to contribute to the creation of knowledge in alternative and renewable energy, as well as in energy efficiency practices and technologies, and to promote the use of alternative resources to contribute to the conservation of the environment and the sustainable development of Puerto Rico, the Antilles and the World.

In order to foster graduate and undergraduate research practicums and intercontinental engineering-research-scientific collaboration, the centre leads a consortium of nationwide universities and national laboratories including Sandia, one if not the school of engineering founding father.

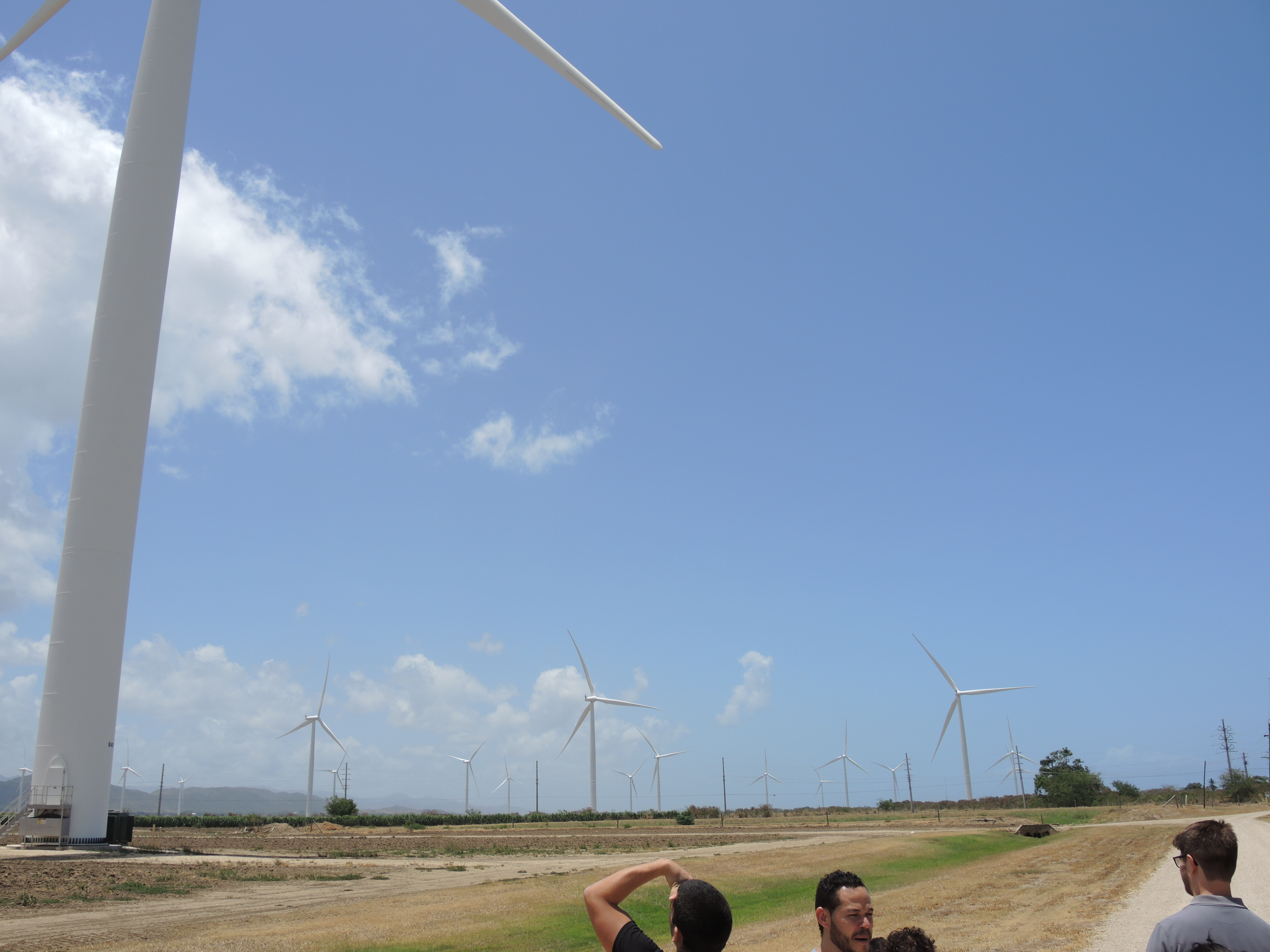
Consortium undergraduate and graduate students visiting Pattern's Energy facility in Santa Isabel, Puerto Rico (c. 2016)

=== Cupey campus (formally Universidad Metropolitana) ===
Universidad Ana G. Méndez, Recinto de Cupey
- Former names: Puerto Rico Junior College; Colegio Universitario Metropolitano; Universidad Metropolitana
- Type: Private University
- Established: 1949; 77 years ago as Puerto Rico Junior College; 1980; 46 years ago as Universidad Metropolitana
- Rector: Dr. José E. Berríos Lugo
- Students: 7,000
- Location: Cupey, Puerto Rico; 18.239647°N 66.006259°W
- Colors: Old:
- Nickname: UMET
- Mascot: formally Cocodrilos
- Website: cupey.uagm.edu

The Cupey Campus formally known as Metropolitan University —or Universidad Metropolitana (UMET) in Spanish— is a private, non-profit, and secular university system in Puerto Rico which is now part of the Ana G. Mendez University. It has five campuses:

- Aguadilla
- Bayamón
- San Juan (now Cupey Campus) is the main campus and usually referred to as the Metropolitan University itself as it was the first campus and is the largest one.

=== Carolina Campus (formally Universidad del Este) ===
Universidad Ana G. Méndez, Recinto de Carolina
- Former names: Puerto Rico College Junior; Colegio Universitario del Este; Universidad del Este
- Type: Private University
- Established: 1990; 36 years ago as Puerto Rico College Junior; 2001; 25 years ago as Universidad del Este
- Rector: Dra. Evelyza Crespo Rivera
- Location: Carolina, Puerto Rico; 18.41345°N 65.9837°W
- Colors: Old:
- Nickname: UNE
- Mascot: formally Pitirres
- Website: carolina.uagm.edu

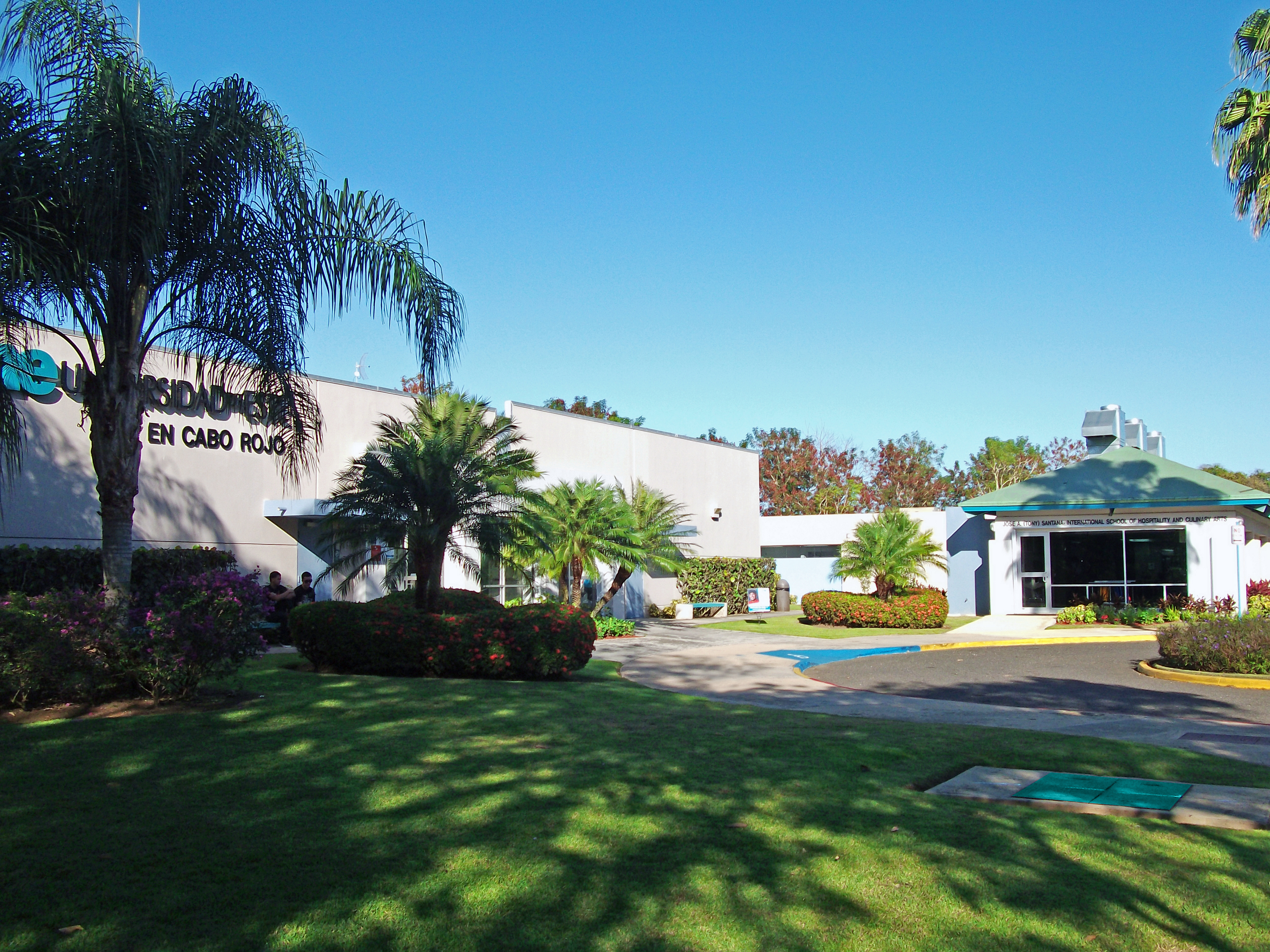
Cabo Rojo campus

The Carolina Campus or formally known as Universidad del Este (UNE) was a private non-profit institution of higher education. Founded in 1949 as Puerto Rico Junior College, it grew into a four-year institution in 1992 and finally evolved into a university in 2001. Universidad del Este offered occupational, liberal arts, education, health, science and business programs leading to certificates, associate, bachelor, and master's degree programs in different disciplines. Its main campus was located in Carolina, Puerto Rico. The university also maintained five off-campus sites located in Yauco, Utuado, Cabo Rojo, Manatí and Santa Isabel. In August 2003, Universidad del Este established its first branch campus, Metro Orlando University Center located in Orlando, Florida.

== TV Station ==
The university also transmits over the air across the broadband via WMTJ (PSIP virtual channel 40, ultra high frequency digital channel 15), a Public Broadcasting Service (PBS) television station. The satellite communications transmission of WMTJ carriers over the spectrum with the call sign WQTO (PSIP virtual channel 26, ultra high frequency digital channel 19), transmitting at an Effective Radiated Power of six hundred ninety-six kilo lumens or Watts. Sistema television studios for «transmitting the good» are located at Rio Piedras in San Juan with the call sign's acronym standing for Méndez Television San Juan

== Athletics ==
The university offers athletic scholarships to outstanding freshman athletes with strong academic potential in swimming, basketball, volleyball, cross country, and others. It has participated in the Puerto Rico Inter-university Athletics League (LAI) (Spanish: Liga Atlética Interuniversitaria de Puerto Rico) since 1975.

== Notable alumni ==
In 2013, the United States army noted that graduates of the University of Turabo often become leaders in the US army.

- Alfredo Alejandro Carrión - Puerto Rican politician and the current mayor of Juncos, PR. Completed a bachelor's degree in business administration at UT.
- Narden Jaime Espinosa - Puerto Rican politician affiliated with the Popular Democratic Party (PPD). Completed a bachelor's degree in business management, with a major in marketing, from UT.
- José Luis Caldero - Superintendent of the Puerto Rico police, completed a master's degree in public affairs at UT.
- Eduardo E. Cintrón Suarez - Puerto Rican politician and the forme mayor of Guayama, completed a master's degree in business administration at UT.
- Luis Vargas Velásquez - artistic gymnast who participated in '04 Summer Olympics, completed a master's degree in health promotion at UT.
- Pedro Rosselló - Physician and politician who served as the seventh Governor of Puerto Rico from 1993 to 2001. He was president of the New Progressive Party from 1991 to 1999 and 2003 to 2008, and served as senator for the District of Arecibo from 2005 to 2008. At UT, Rosselló completed his doctorate in education, with a specialization in educational leadership.
- Karla Inelisse Guilfú Acevedo - Miss Universe Puerto Rico 2023.
