= Ana G. Méndez =

Puerto Rican educator

- Founder of the Ana G. Méndez University System
- Born: Ana González Cofresí; January 7, 1908; Aguada, Puerto Rico
- Died: February 18, 1997 (aged 89); San Juan, Puerto Rico
- Other names: Ana G. Méndez; Ana González de Méndez
- Occupation: Educator
- Spouse: José Méndez Rivera
- Children: Dora Méndez González; Grecia Méndez González; José Méndez González

Ana González Cofresí (January 7, 1908 – February 18, 1997), better known as Ana G. Méndez, was a Puerto Rican educator who founded the Ana G. Méndez University System in Puerto Rico.

== Early years ==
Méndez was one of eight children born to Francisco González Monge and Ana Cofresí Sánchez in Aguada, Puerto Rico. She was of Austrian descent via her mother, who was a direct descendant of the Puerto Rican pirate Roberto Cofresí (the original last name was Kupferschein). In 1935, Méndez graduated from high school in Santurce; she earned her bachelor's degree in commercial education from the University of Puerto Rico in 1940. It was during the 1940s that she realised that students should have the option of having a short term college for a commercial or technical career, this led in 1941, to her founding the Puerto Rican High School of Commerce with three teachers and nine students.

== Personal life ==
She got married when she was 15 years old to José Méndez Rivera and they had three children together: Dora, Grecia, and José Méndez González.

== Founder of Puerto Rico Junior College ==
In 1948, Méndez graduated from New York University with a master's degree. In 1948, she founded the Puerto Rico Junior College in Río Piedras with 19 students; this became the first educational institution in Puerto Rico to offer an associate degree (2 year college). An educational visionary, Méndez founded universities, television stations, college classes by mail and as mentioned above the associate degree.

== Universities founded by Méndez ==
Among the universities founded by Méndez are:

- The University of Turabo, which is located in Caguas, Puerto Rico with branches in Cayey, Isabela, Ponce, Yabucoa, Barceloneta and Naguabo.
- The Universidad del Este (University of the East), which is located in Carolina, Puerto Rico with branches in Santa Isabel, Cabo Rojo, Barceloneta, Utuado and in Yauco;
- The Metropolitan University, which is located in Cupey with branches in Bayamón, Aguadilla, Jayuya, and in Comerío.

== Ana G. Méndez Foundation ==
Méndez also founded the "Ana G. Méndez Foundation" which grants scholarships to outstanding students and she also found TV Channel 40 "The Ana G. Méndez Educational Channel". What today is known as the "Ana G. Méndez University System" and started with only nine students, now has over 17,000 students, 800 professors and 500 administrative employees.

== Legacy ==
In 1965, Méndez became the "first" and only Puerto Rican woman amongst the Board of Directors of Eastern Air Lines. In 1975, the Catholic University of Puerto Rico awarded to Méndez an honorary doctoral degree in humanities. Ana G. Méndez died on 18 February 1997 in San Juan, Puerto Rico. Puerto Rico honored her memory by naming an avenue in San Juan after her. On 10 July 2003, Mayor Buddy Dyer of Orlando, Florida, announced the opening of the "Ana G. Méndez Metro Orlando University".

== See also ==
- List of Puerto Ricans
- History of women in Puerto Rico
