= Manuel Ramos Otero =

Puerto Rican poet (1948–1990)

- Born: July 20, 1948; Manatí, Puerto Rico
- Died: October 7, 1990 (aged 42); San Juan, Puerto Rico
- Occupations: Short story writer; poet; essayist
- Writing career
- Notable work: The Story of the Woman of the Sea

Manuel Ramos Otero (July 20, 1948 – October 7, 1990) was a Puerto Rican writer. He is widely considered to be the most important openly gay twentieth-century Puerto Rican writer who wrote in Spanish, and his work was often controversial due to its sexual and political content. Ramos Otero died in San Juan, Puerto Rico, from complications of AIDS.

== Life ==
Jesús Manuel Ramos Otero was born in Manatí, Puerto Rico, and spent his childhood in his home town, living in the second location of the old building of the Puerto Rican Casino of Manatí. He began his studies at the Colegio La Inmaculada in Manatí. His family then moved to San Juan when he was seven years old. He later attended the University High School, better known as UHS (1960–1965) and went on to receive a B.A. in Social Sciences (with a major in sociology and a minor in political sciences) from the University of Puerto Rico, Río Piedras Campus, graduating in 1969. In 1979 he received an M.A. in literature from New York University. While living in New York City, he worked as a social researcher, and later as a professor at diverse universities including Rutgers University, LaGuardia Community College, York College, and Lehman College. He also established a small publishing house, El Libro Viaje. He organized conferences and gatherings of his Puerto Rican writer friends in the United States such as Giannina Braschi and Luis Rafael Sanchez. He is best remembered as a poet and the author of short stories, but he also wrote a novel and several essays on literary criticism.

In 1990, Otero returned to Puerto Rico to live out his final days. He died on October 7 of that year of complications from HIV/AIDS. His posthumously-published work, Invitación a polvo, which Otero defined as “completely untranslatable,” directly addresses topics around the AIDS crisis. In 1998, the Guadalajara International Book Fair published Tálamos y tumbas prosa y verso, a collection of short stories, and the book of poetry, El libro de la muerte.

In 1999, and again in 2002, the Pregones Theatre company in the Bronx adapted Ramos Otero’s short story, “Loca la de la locura” to stage the play “El bolero fue mi ruina”. It was then adapted to an off-Broadway show in 2002 and staged by the Hostos Center for the Arts and Culture.

== Literary production ==
Many but not all of Ramos Otero's works focus on autobiographical characters of gay Puerto Rican men who are writers and live in New York City.

One of Ramos Otero's most interesting stories is "La última plena que bailó Luberza" (Luberza's Last Plena Dance), which he published in 1975 in the literary journal Zona de carga y descarga alongside a story by Rosario Ferré ("Cuando las mujeres quieren a los hombres"). Ramos Otero's and Ferré's stories were based on the life of Isabel Luberza Oppenheimer (better known as Isabel la Negra), a famous madam who ran a brothel in the city of Ponce from the 1930s to the 1960s. Ramos Otero's story was later included in his book El cuento de la Mujer del Mar (The Story of the Woman of the Sea).

In his work, Ramos Otero openly defends gay viewpoints and feminist positions. For him, homosexuality represented an outsider status; he did not advocate for full integration, but rather explored the situation of marginal subjects. He also discussed his HIV status and the prejudice and discrimination faced by people affected by AIDS. Most of his production has not been translated and is only available in Spanish.

== Works ==
=== Essays ===
- "De la colonización a la culonización." Cupey 8, no. 1-2 (1991): 63-79.
- "La ética de la marginación en la poesía de Luis Cernuda." Cupey 5, no. 1-2 (1988): 16-29.
- "Ficción e historia: Texto y pretexto de la autobiografía." El mundo (Puerto Rico Ilustrado) [San Juan, P.R.] 14 de octubre de 1990: 20-23.

=== Narrative ===
- Concierto de metal para un recuerdo y otras orgías de soledad. San Juan: Editorial Cultural, 1971.
- La novelabingo. New York: Editorial El Libro Viaje, 1976.
- El cuento de la Mujer del Mar. Río Piedras: Ediciones Huracán, 1979.
- Página en blanco y staccato. 2nda ed. Madrid: Editorial Playor, 1988 [1987].
- Cuentos de buena tinta. San Juan: Instituto de Cultura Puertorriqueña, 1992.

=== Poetry ===
- Invitación al polvo. Madrid: Editorial Plaza Mayor, 1991.
- El libro de la muerte. Río Piedras: Editorial Cultural; Maplewood, N.J.: Waterfront Press, 1985.

== Collected works ==
- Cuentos (casi) completos. Edited by Arnaldo Cruz-Malavé. Havana, Cuba: Fondo Editorial Casa de las Américas, 2019. ISBN 9789592605503
- Cuentos "completos." Edited by Arnaldo Cruz-Malavé. San Juan, Puerto Rico: Editorial del Instituto de Cultura Puertorriqueña and Ediciones Callejón, 2023. ISBN 9780865817678
- Tálamos y tumbas: prosa y verso. Guadalajara, Jalisco, Mexico: Universidad de Guadalajara, 1998. ISBN 9789688958452

== Critical reception ==
Numerous literary scholars have written about Ramos Otero, including Arnaldo Cruz-Malavé, Jossianna Arroyo, Juan G. Gelpí, and José Quiroga. Rubén Ríos Ávila has compared Ramos Otero's experiences in New York to those of the exiled Cuban writer Reinaldo Arenas. Lawrence La Fountain-Stokes has written about Ramos Otero in the context of the Puerto Rican queer diaspora, comparing him to other artists such as Luz María Umpierre, Frances Negrón-Muntaner, Nemir Matos-Cintrón, and Erika Lopez.

== See also ==
- LGBT literature
- LGBT rights in Puerto Rico
- List of Puerto Ricans
- List of gay, lesbian or bisexual people
- List of LGBT writers
- List of Puerto Rican writers
- Puerto Rican literature
- Puerto Ricans in the United States
