= Agustin Cartagena Diaz =

Former Superintendent of the Puerto Rico Police

Agustin Cartagena Diaz was born in Puerto Rico and a Colonel with the Puerto Rico Police who became the 17th Superintendent of the Puerto Rico Police elected in the first year of the administration of Governor Sila María Calderón from 2003 to 2005.
