= Juan César Cordero Dávila =

United States General

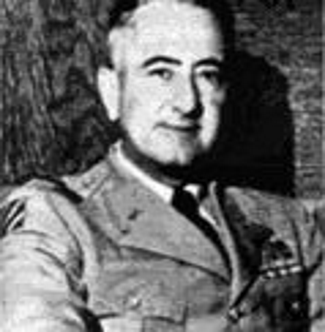
- Major General Juan César Cordero Dávila

Adjutant General of Puerto Rico
- In office 1958–1965
- Governor: Luis Muñoz Marín; Roberto Sánchez Vilella
- Preceded by: Eduardo Andino
- Succeeded by: Salvador T. Roig

Personal details
- Born: June 7, 1904 Carolina, Puerto Rico
- Died: July 20, 1965 (aged 61) Puerto Rico
- Resting place: Puerto Rico National Cemetery in Bayamón, Puerto Rico
- Awards: Silver Star; Bronze Star

Military service
- Allegiance: United States
- Branch/service: United States Army
- Years of service: 1925–1965
- Rank: Major General
- Unit: Infantry Branch
- Commands: 65th Infantry Regiment; Puerto Rico Adjutant General
- Battles/wars: World War II; Korean War

Major General Juan César Cordero Dávila (June 7, 1904 – July 20, 1965) was the commanding officer of the 65th Infantry Regiment during the Korean War, rising to become one of the highest ranking ethnic officers in the United States Army.

His active military career began on June 1, 1942, when he was summoned to serve in World War II. On January 2, 1952, he was reassigned to Third Infantry Division took over the 65th, commanding them along a set of Korean and Belgium battalions and platoon from Luxembourg. He also served as an S-4 and as executive officer of the 65th. On July 20, 1965, Cordero died during an accident involving a plane.

== Early years ==
Cordero Dávila, born in barrio Trujillo Bajo of Carolina, Puerto Rico, lived in the San Juan Metropolitan Area. He started his education in his native barrio, under Isaías González. Cordero completed his elementary education in the public schools of Carolina. Midway through high school, he joined the UPR's high school, from which he graduated. Afterwards he was accepted at the "Colegio de Agricultura y Artes Mecanicas" (CAAM) (now the University of Puerto Rico at Mayagüez, where he actively participated in that institution's Army ROTC program. In 1925, he earned his degree as a civil engineer. He also gained his United States Army Reserve commission as a Second Lieutenant

He was then employed by the Department of Interior and later joined the Irrigation Service in Isabela. When he was 23 years old, Cordero was named Superintendent of Irrigation, remaining in the office until 1938. Cordero was then named director of the Housing Authority of Puerto Rico. On May 25, 1930, Cordero married Elvira Rabell, with whom he had three children, Elvira, César Guillermo and César Narciso.

== World War II ==
Cordero Dávila was assigned to the 65th Infantry Regiment at Camp Las Casas in Santurce, Puerto Rico. In 1942, the regiment underwent an extensive training program and in 1943, was sent to Panama to protect the Pacific and the Atlantic sides of the isthmus. In 1944, the regiment was sent to North Africa, arriving at Casablanca, where they underwent further training. By April 29, 1944, the regiment had landed in Italy and moved on to Corsica. In Corsica they were assigned to guard Army Air Force installations. On September 22, 1944, the 65th Infantry landed in Toulon, France, and was committed to action on the Maritime Alps at Peira Cava. On December 13, the 3rd Battalion under the command of Cordero Dávila, then a lieutenant colonel, relieved the 2nd Battalion of the Japanese-American 442nd "Nisei" Infantry Regiment which was under the command of fellow Puerto Rican Col. Virgil R. Miller. Opinions of Cordero's leadership skills were mixed. See video discussion of Cordero's leadership. The 65th Infantry faced the German 34th Infantry Divisions 107th Infantry Regiment and participated in a number of small unit engagements at Turine, Espinal-Chenimeril and Leintray.

Cordero-Dávila served with the regiment in World War II for over three and a half years, advancing from the regimental S-4 to battalion executive officer, battalion commander of the regiment's 3rd Battalion, and regimental executive officer. He also served for short periods during World War II as the regimental commander. After the war concluded, Cordero returned to the reserve for six months, then taking command of the Puerto Rico National Guard's 296th Combat Group. On September 10, 1950, Cordero was activated again due to the Korean War, commanding the 296th and overseeing Campamento Tortuguero, Campamento Salinas and Forts Losey and the Henry Barracks.

== Korean War ==
When World War II came to an end, Cordero Dávila returned to Puerto Rico and assumed the command of the 296th Regimental Combat Team. He was responsible for training most of the men serving in the 65th Infantry.

On August 26, 1950, the 65th Infantry under the command of Colonel William Warner Harris, left Puerto Rico for Pusan, Korea, and arrived there on September 23, 1950. Under the command of Colonel Harris, the 65th became the third regiment to cross the Han Ton River. The 65th was the regiment which took and held Cherwon, and they were also instrumental in breaking the Iron Triangle of Hill 717 in July 1951. In November 1951, the regiment fought off an attack by two regimental-size enemy units, with success.

On February 8, 1952, General J. Lawton Collins, the Army Chief of Staff, named Colonel Cordero Dávila, the highest-ranking Puerto Rican in the Army, commanding officer of the 65th Regiment.

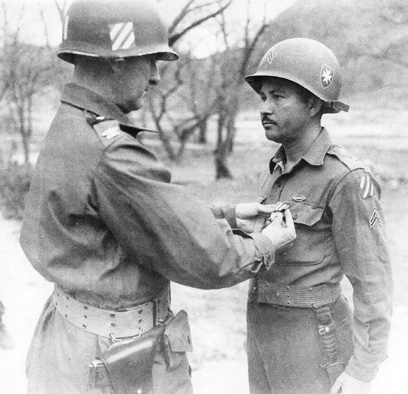
General Cordero pins the Silver Star on Cpl. Enrique Vega Lugo

On July 3, 1952, the regiment defended the MLR for 47 days and saw action at Cognac, King and Queen with successful attacks on Chinese People's Volunteer Army (PVA) positions. On July 20, after an enemy counterattack, Cordero Dávila exposed himself to enemy fire and helped to evacuate the wounded men of Company "C" and guide them to safety. Cordero Dávila, a Bronze Star recipient, was awarded the Silver Star for his actions. On October the regiment also saw action in the Cherwon Sector and on Iron Horse, Hill 391, whose lower part was called "Jackson Heights".

In September 1952, the 65th Infantry was holding on to a position known as "Outpost Kelly". The PVA overran the hill in what became known as the Battle of Outpost Kelly. Twice the 65th Regiment was overwhelmed by PVA artillery and driven off. For his performance during this time, Cordero was congratulated by Gen. Thomas Cross, who labeled one of the attacks supervised by Cordero as "the best attack [that he] witnessed in three wars".

Col. Juan César Cordero Dávila was relieved from his command as regimental commander by Col. Chester B. DeGavre, a non-Hispanic West Point graduate and a "continental," officer from the mainland United States.*

== Silver Star citation ==
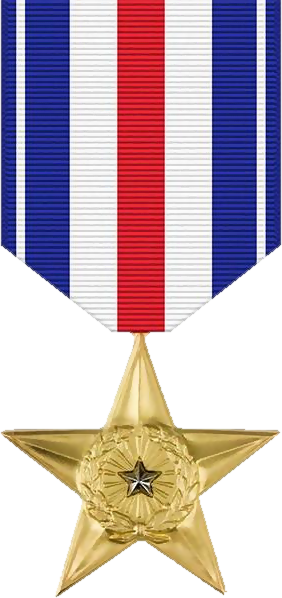

Juan César Cordero Dávila

Rank:Colonel
HEADQUARTERS 3D INFANTRY DIVISION
GENERAL ORDERS #303 - 23 September 1952
Citation:

Colonel Juan C. Cordero, 0222751, Infantry, Headquarters and Headquarters Company, 65th Infantry Regiment, 3rd Infantry Division, United States Army.

on July 20, 1952, Company "C" was attempting a withdrawal after completing a raiding mission on enemy positions near Chongdong, Korea. In the initial phase of the withdrawal the friendly troops were subjected to intense hostile automatic weapons, artillery and mortar fire from nearby enemy positions. Under the withering fire the men became disorganized and began to move in all directions. Realizing the necessity for the company to effect an orderly withdrawal and evacuate the wounded, Colonel Cordero, the regimental commander, continuously exposed himself to the hostile bombardment as he moved among the men, offering encouragement and directing them through the heavy enemy fire. Inspired by his courage, the men assumed the initiative and continued to move toward friendly positions. At this time the ridge line over which the withdrawal was to be made was subjected to heavy artillery and mortar fire. Despite the urging of his executive officer that he seek a place of safety, Colonel Cordero refused to leave his men, and with complete disregard for his personal safety, braved the enemy fire to ensure that all had reached safety and the wounded had been evacuated. Colonel Cordero's gallant and inspirational leadership was instrumental to the success of the withdrawal and reflects the highest credit upon himself and the military service. Entered the Federal Service from Puerto Rico.

== Later years ==
On January 2, 1953, Cordero returned to Puerto Rico and retook command of the 296th. He also resumed his civil work in the housing projects. While working as executive director of CRUV, he was named Puerto Rico's Adjutant General, replacing Esteves who had retired due to health issues. Cordero took office on October 1, 1958, and was promoted to the rank of brigadier general. On July 6, 1960, Cordero was ascended to the rank of division general.

The 65th Infantry was deactivated when it returned to Puerto Rico in 1956. General Cordero Dávila persuaded the Department of the Army to transfer the 65th Infantry from the regular Army to the Puerto Rican National Guard. This was the only unit ever transferred from active component Army to the Army Guard. He also served as executive director of the Puerto Rico Housing Authority and housing coordinator for the governor of Puerto Rico Luis Muñoz Marín. On July 20, 1965, Major General Juan César Cordero Dávila died in an airplane-related accident. He was buried at the Puerto Rico National Cemetery with full military honors on July 22 and was survived by his wife Elvira Rubell and three children.

== Legacy ==
The Government of Puerto Rico named the building which houses the Housing Department of Puerto Rico, located at Avenida Barbosa in Rio Piedras, Puerto Rico The Juan César Cordero Dávila Building in his honor. The government also named a public housing project in San Juan after him. His son César Narciso would follow in his footsteps, becoming an officer in the PRNG.

In 2020 Juan César Cordero Dávila was posthumously inducted to the Puerto Rico Veterans Hall of Fame.

== Military awards and decorations ==
Among Cordero Dávila's decorations were the following:

Combat Infantryman Badge (2nd award)
3rd Infantry Division Combat Service Identification Badge

Silver Star
Bronze Star
World War II Victory Medal
American Defense Service Medal
European-African-Middle Eastern Campaign Medal
Army Presidential Unit Citation
Army Meritorious Unit Commendation
National Defense Service Medal
Armed Forces Reserve Medal with bronze Hourglass Device
Korean Service Medal with silver service star
United Nations Korea Medal
Republic of Korea Presidential Unit Citation

Foreign decoration

The Bravery Gold Medal of Greece was given by the Government of Greece to the 65th Infantry Regiment and to the members of the regiment who fought in the Korean War.

- Chryssoun Aristion Andrias (Bravery Gold Medal of Greece)

Congressional Gold Medal

External videos
- You can see a video of President Barack Obama awarding the Congressional Gold Medal to the Borinqueneers HERE

On June 10, 2014, President Barack Obama, signed the legislation known as "The Borinqueneers CGM Bill" at an official ceremony. The Bill honors the 65th Infantry Regiment with the Congressional Gold Medal.

== Promotions ==
Insignia	Rank	Date
	Major general	1958-1965
	Brigadier general	1954-1958
	Colonel	1945-1954
	Lieutenant colonel	1944-1945
	Major	1931-1944
	Captain	1929-1931
	First lieutenant	1927-1929
	Second lieutenant	1926-1927

== See also ==
- List of Puerto Ricans
- List of Puerto Rican military personnel
- Puerto Ricans in World War II
- 65th Infantry
- Puerto Rico Adjutant General
- Borinqueneers Congressional Gold Medal

Military offices
Preceded by Brigadier General Eduardo Andino	Adjutant General of the Puerto Rico National Guard; Under Governor Luis Muñoz Marín; 1958–1965	Succeeded by Major General Salvador T. Roig
