= Salvador T. Roig =

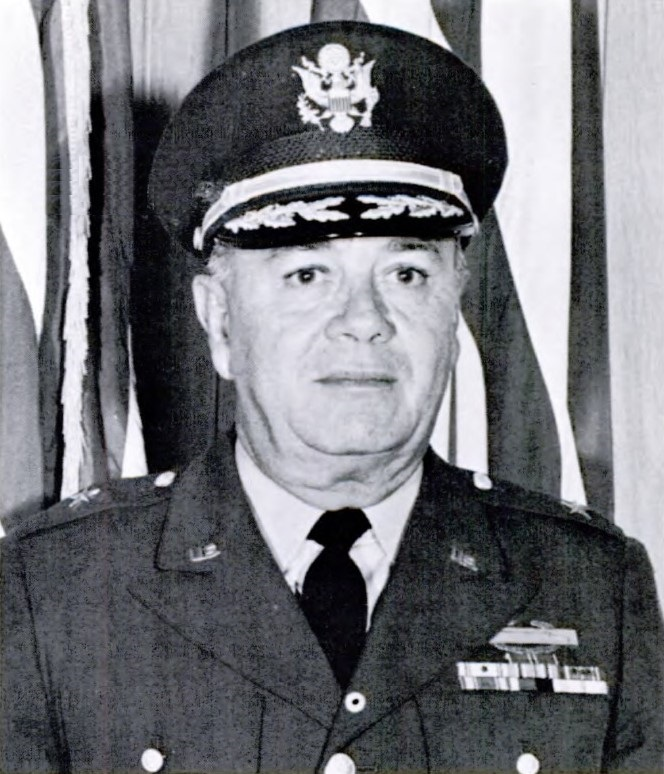
- Brigadier General Savaldor T. Roig

Adjutant General of Puerto Rico
- In office 1965–1968
- Governor: Roberto Sánchez Vilella
- Preceded by: Juan César Cordero Dávila
- Succeeded by: Alberto A. Picó

Superintendent of the Puerto Rico Police
- In office 1963–1966
- Governor: Luis Muñoz Marín
- Preceded by: Ramón Torres Braschi
- Succeeded by: Salvador Rodriguez Aponte

Personal details
- Born: November 9, 1907 Yauco, Puerto Rico
- Died: July 6, 1984 (aged 76) Rio Piedras, Puerto Rico

Military service
- Allegiance: United States; Puerto Rico
- Branch/service: United States Army; Army National Guard
- Years of service: 1926-1968
- Rank: Brigadier general
- Unit: 295th Infantry Regiment
- Commands: Puerto Rico Adjutant General; 296th Infantry Regiment; 65th Infantry Regiment
- Battles/wars: World War II
- Awards: Bronze Star Medal

Brigadier General Salvador Teodoro Roig Marietti, (November 9, 1907 – July 6, 1984), was the Superintendent of the Puerto Rico Police Department under the Government of Luis Muñoz Marín, and Adjutant General of the National Guard under the Government of Roberto Sánchez Vilella.

Roig was appointed Chief of police of Puerto Rico for a second time in 1963, and he was subsequently appointed to the position of Adjutant General of the Puerto Rico National Guard. Among his accomplishments as a public servant stands have occupied the positions of Chief of Police of Puerto Rico, Military Assistant and Chief of Protocol of La Fortaleza (The Fortress) under the Government of Jesús T. Piñero. He was also exalted in the Puerto Rican Sports Hall of Fame for his exploits in the sport of archery target.

== Early years ==
Roig was born in Yauco, Puerto Rico, to Juan Roig and Angela Marrietti on November 9, 1907. Roig completed his high school education in the UPR's high school. On November 26, 1926, Roig enlisted to the Puerto Rico National Guard. Afterwards, he began his superior education at the Agriculture and Mechanical Arts in Mayagüez, where he joined the Army ROTC. During this time, Roig also served in Company I of the 295th Infantry Regiment and Company G of the 296th Infantry Regiment, becoming the ranks of second lieutenant and first lieutenant. In 1931, Roig completed his degree in Agricultural Sciences. In June 1936, Roig was promoted to the rank of captain. In 1938, he was selected to attend training at Fort Benning, from where he graduated. He also graduated from the FBI Training Academy in Washington. Roig married Aida Mejía, with whom he had three children, Salvador II, Angel and Yan.

== Education and military career ==
He earned a bachelor's degree in agricultural sciences in the College of Agriculture and Mechanical Arts (CAAM) of Mayagüez. Started his military career as a private in the Puerto Rico National Guard. In October 1940, Roig was activated to serve in the regular United States Army in World War II and was placed in charge of Company G of the 296th Regiment which was stationed at Campamento Tortuguero under Gen. Luis Esteves. In January 1941, Roig returned to Fort Benning to attend a course for battalion commanders and other officers, returning to his previous post after completing it. On December 8, 1941, Roig was transferred to Saint Thomas along with several men, where he was given the charge of organize the defenses of the Virgin Islands along the navy. During this time, he was promoted to the rank of commander and was congratulated by the Commander of the Military Department of the Antilles for his work leading infantry troops. Afterwards, Roig was transferred to Puerto Rico and assigned to the 65th Infantry Regiment. While serving in Panama, he was promoted to the rank of lieutenant colonel and assigned as Assistant Director Air Defense at Albrook Air Force Station, 6th Air Force in the Panama Canal Zone. In November 1943, Roig was tasked with commanding the Infantry Units in charge of the defenses in the Galapagos Islands. The following year, after receiving additional training Roig was transferred to Marseilles, where he remained until the winter. He then took command of the 65th Regiment and lead them at the Alps, the first time that a fully Puerto Rican unit was led by a local officer in combat. From there, he was assigned to take part in an offensive on March 25, 1944. In September 1945, Roig was promoted to the rank of Infantry Colonel and shortly afterwards the 65th returned to Puerto Rico. Afterwards, Roig was licensed and recruited by colonial governor Rexford Guy Tugwell to serve as Police Chief in 1946.

The next governor, Jesús T. Piñero, tasked him with the offices of Military Adviser and Chief of Protocol for La Fortaleza. He continued as a member of the reserve until 1952. In 1954, he represented Puerto Rico with the Police Shooting Team, being recognized as the most accomplished 12 gauge shotgun shooter. During the Muñoz Marín administration, Roig served as Chief and Superintendent of the Police. In 1964, Roig was inducted to the Puerto Rico Sports Hall of Fame. On March 20, 1966, Roig was named Adjutant General of the PRNG by Roberto Sánchez Vilella.

== Legacy ==
Roig died on July 6, 1984, at the San Juan VA Medical Center in Rio Piedras, Puerto Rico. He was buried at the Yauco Municipal Cemetery in Yauco, Puerto Rico.

The Puerto Rico Police Department Station in Yauco, Puerto Rico was posthumously named after former Puerto Rico Police Superintendent, Salvador T. Roig.

In 2022 Salvador T. Roig was posthumously inducted to the Puerto Rico Veterans Hall of Fame.

== Military awards and decorations ==
Among Roig's decorations are the following:

Bronze Star Medal
American Defense Service Medal with one bronze Service star
American Campaign Medal
European-African-Middle East Campaign Medal with four bronze Service stars
World War II Victory Medal
Army of Occupation Medal
Armed Forces Reserve Medal with Gold hourglass device
Army Presidential Unit Citation

Foreign decoration

- Chryssoun Aristion Andrias (Bravery Gold Medal of Greece)

Badges:

- Combat Infantryman Badge

== Promotions ==
Insignia	Rank	Date
	Brigadier General	1966
	Colonel	1945
	Lieutenant Colonel	1943
	Major	1942
	Captain	1936
	First Lieutenant	1931
	Second Lieutenant	1929

== See also ==
- List of Puerto Rican military personnel
- Puerto Rico Adjutant General

Police appointments
Preceded by Ramón Torres Braschi	Superintendent of the Puerto Rico Police; 1963–1966	Succeeded by Salvador Rodriguez Aponte
Military offices
Preceded by Major General Juan César Cordero Dávila	Adjutant General of the Puerto Rico National Guard; Under Governor Roberto Sánchez Vilella; 1965–1968	Succeeded by Major General Alberto A. Picó
