= Zitron =

Zitron is a surname. Notable people with the surname include:

- Ed Zitron (born 1986), English author, podcaster and critic of the technology industry
- Michel Zitron (born 1981), Swedish record producer, singer-songwriter and DJ
- Samuel Leib Zitron (1860–1930), Hebrew and Yiddish writer, historian and literary critic

== See also ==
- Léon Zitrone (1914–1995), French journalist and television presenter
