= Víctor Rivera González =

Superintendent of the Puerto Rico Police Department

Superintendent of the Puerto Rico Police
- In office 2002–2003
- Governor: Sila María Calderón
- Preceded by: Miguel Pereira Castillo
- Succeeded by: Agustín Cartagena Díaz

Personal details
- Born: 1948 (age 77–78) Vega Baja, Puerto Rico
- Education: University of Puerto Rico School of Law (JD)
- Occupation: lawyer

Victor Manuel Rivera Gonzalez (born 1948 in Vega Baja, Puerto Rico) is a Puerto Rican attorney and former district judge, former Puerto Rico Department of Corrections and Rehabilitation and Chief of Police, known in Puerto Rico, especially among prisoners and police officers, for his work during Sila María Calderón's administration.

After receiving an Education and later a law degree from the University of Puerto Rico School of Law, Rivera Gonzalez gained experience and reputation working in various law-related fields, including the prosecutor's office, Interpol and NIE (Special Investigations Bureau). He was later named Superior Court Judge, a position he held for a large part of his career.

After Sila María Calderón was elected governor of Puerto Rico in 2000, she appointed Rivera Gonzalez to be her Secretary of Corrections and later police superintendent, or police chief of the entire Commonwealth of Puerto Rico.

Rivera Gonzalez, identified with the Popular PPD party, but having no particular loyalties to any of the major parties, was well known and liked by many, if not most of the prisoners soon after becoming Secretary of Corrections, due to his strong support for rehabilitation rather than mere punishment. Rivera Gonzalez would even, on occasion, reward good behavior in his prisons by inviting celebrities like Sugar Ray Leonard for exhibition matches or by creating basketball tournaments among the prisons.

Halfway through his tenure, Governor Calderón switched Rivera Gonzalez and Miguel Pereira's posts, making the latter Secretary of Corrections and allowing Rivera Gonzalez to become Superintendent Chief of Police.

Rivera would once again find support, this time from most police officers, who felt he was aware of their needs and problems and was not interested in simply moving up politically.

Rivera Gonzalez, however, did not complete his 4-year term, leaving on January 6, 2004. He cited economic reasons for leaving public office.

Today, Rivera Gonzalez enjoys a less rigorous routine, working at a private Law firm in San Juan, where he specializes in Construction Law. He has been married to actress Gladys Rodríguez for more than 20 years, and two of his children have followed in his footsteps by studying Law as well.

== See also ==
- List of famous Puerto Ricans

Police appointments
Preceded by Miguel Pereira Castillo	Superintendent of the Puerto Rico Police; 2002-2003	Succeeded by Agustín Cartagena Díaz
