= Miguel Pereira Castillo =

Puerto Rico politician

Miguel Pereira

Member of the Puerto Rico Senate from at-large district
- In office January 2, 2017 – January 2, 2021

Member of Puerto Rican Senate from the Guayama District
- In office January 2, 2013 – January 2, 2017

Secretary of Department of Corrections and Rehabilitation
- In office November 2, 2003 – January 1, 2009
- Governor: Sila Calderón; Aníbal Acevedo Vilá
- Succeeded by: Carlos Molina

Superintendent of the Puerto Rico Police
- In office May 14, 2002 – November 1, 2003
- Governor: Sila Calderón
- Preceded by: Pierre Vivoni del Valle
- Succeeded by: Víctor Rivera González

Executive Director of the Puerto Rico Ports Authority
- In office January 2, 2001 – 2002
- Governor: Sila Calderón

Personal details
- Born: September 26, 1947 (age 79) Cayey, Puerto Rico
- Party: Popular Democratic Party (PPD)
- Education: University of Puerto Rico (BA); Hofstra University School of Law (JD)

Military service
- Allegiance: United States of America
- Branch/service: United States Air Force
- Rank: Lieutenant Colonel
- Battles/wars: Vietnam War
- Awards: Silver Star; Purple Heart; Airman's Medal

Miguel A. Pereira Castillo (born September 26, 1947) is a Puerto Rican politician, attorney, and public servant. Throughout his career, he has served in various government positions like Director of the Puerto Rico Ports Authority, Superintendent of the Puerto Rico Police Department and Secretary of the Puerto Rico Department of Corrections and Rehabilitation. In 2012, he was elected to the Senate of Puerto Rico for the District of Guayama.

He is married to Public Relations Practitioner, Annie Bird.

== Early years and studies ==
Miguel Pereira Castillo was born on September 26, 1947, in Cayey, Puerto Rico. His parents were two schoolteachers, Miguel and Gilda. Pereira studied in Puerto Rico public school system, obtaining his high school diploma from the Benjamin Harrison School in his hometown.

In 1964, Pereira enrolled in the University of Puerto Rico in Río Piedras to complete a Bachelor's degree in psychology. While studying there, he had his first military experience with the Reserve Officers' Training Corps (ROTC). Pereira graduated in 1968 in the middle of the Vietnam War.

== Military and professional career ==
After graduating, Pereira joined the United States Air Force and became a rescue helicopter pilot during the Vietnam War. During that time, he accrued more than 1,000 flight hours. Pereira who did 2 tours in Vietnam while serving with the 40th Aerospace Rescue and Recovery Squadron Pereira was shot down on December 27, 1972, while flying a rescue mission 22 miles (35 km) away from Hanoi. He also received a shot on his right arm for which he received a Purple Heart. He would later receive a Silver Star as well.

After five years, Pereira earned a scholarship to study law at Hofstra University School of Law in New York. After passing the bar exam, he returned to the Air Force at the United States Air Force Judge Advocate General's Corps where he served from 1976 to 1988. After that, he started working as a trial attorney for the United States Department of Justice in Washington, D.C. He worked as assistant United States Attorney for the District of Puerto Rico for 10 years.

== Public service ==
In 2001, Governor of Puerto Rico Sila Calderón appointed Pereira as Executive Director of the Puerto Rico Ports Authority. However, on 2002, Calderón put Pereira in charge of the Puerto Rico Police Department. The next year, Pereira swapped positions with Víctor Rivera González, which left him as Secretary of the Puerto Rico Department of Corrections and Rehabilitation.

When Aníbal Acevedo Vilá won the 2004 elections, he left Pereira in charge of the Department of Corrections. Pereira occupied the seat for the next four years, finishing his term on January 1, 2009. During his tenure, Pereira promoted the medication of drug addicts treating them as sick people instead of delinquents.

== Political career ==
On October 29, 2011, Pereira presented his candidacy to the Senate of Puerto Rico with the Popular Democratic Party (PPD). He decided to run for the District of Guayama because he was "born, raised, and educated in it." In March 2012, he was the candidate with most votes within his district during the PPD primaries. After the general elections, Pereira resulted victorious earning a seat in the Senate.

== Military awards ==
- Silver Star
- Purple Heart
- Airman's Medal
- National Defense Service Medal with 1 service star
- Vietnam Service Medal
- Air Force Longevity Service Award
- Vietnam Campaign Medal

Police appointments
Preceded by Pierre Vivoni Del Valle	Superintendent of the Puerto Rico Police; 2002–2003	Succeeded by Víctor Rivera González
