= Nemir Matos-Cintrón =

Puerto Rican writer (born 1949)

Nemir Matos Cintrón
- Born: 1949 (age 76–77); Santurce, Puerto Rico
- Occupations: Poet, writer, media specialist
- Writing career
- Notable works: Las mujeres no hablan asi, A través del aire y del fuego pero no del cristal, El arte de morir y La pequeña muerte, Aliens in NYC.

Nemir Matos Cintrón (born 1949) is a Puerto Rican author who resides in Florida. She has published several books of poetry and parts of a novel. She has openly thematized her lesbianism in much of her work.

== Life ==
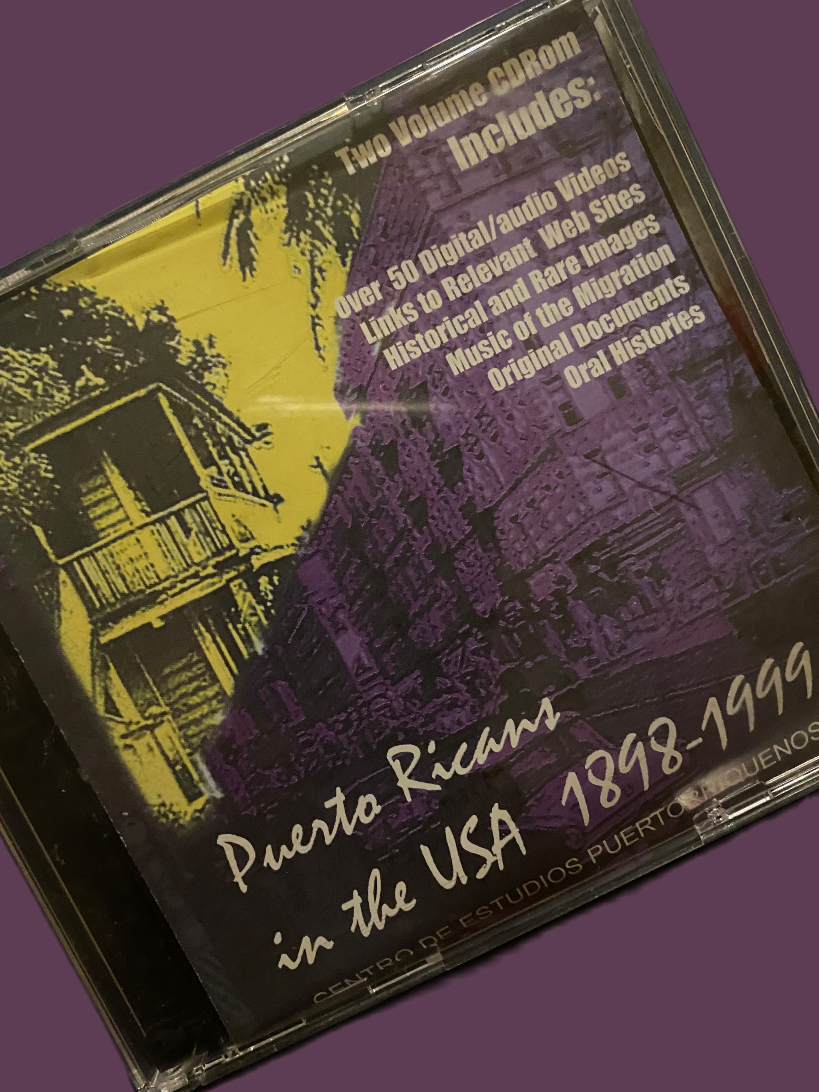
CD-ROM: Puerto Ricans in the USA: 100 Years

Matos Cintrón was born on November 19, 1949, in Santurce, Puerto Rico. She received her B.A. in Humanities from the University of Puerto Rico, her M.S. in Radio and Television from the S. I. Newhouse School of Public Communications at Syracuse University, and her Ed.D. in Educational Technology from Nova Southeastern University.

During the 1980s, Matos Cintrón taught television production courses at the Universidad del Sagrado Corazón in Puerto Rico. She also worked as television producer for the all news Channel 24. At the same time she collaborated as scriptwriter for the miniseries Color de Piel, dealing with racial tensions in Puerto Rican contemporary society. Her television writing led her to the creation and scripting of Insólito, a dramatic anthology series dealing with supernatural phenomena in the Caribbean. In the 1990s, she returned to academia, as lecturer at City University of New York. Her passion for Puerto Rican and Latino Studies, and Multimedia Technology culminated with the research, production and publication of the multimedia CD-ROM Puerto Ricans in the USA: A Hundred Years. In 2001, she moved to Orlando, Florida, where she works as an Instructional Designer.

== Literary production ==
In 1981, Matos Cintrón published her first two poetry books: Las mujeres no hablan así (San Juan, Puerto Rico: Atabex, 1981) and A través del aire y del fuego pero no del cristal (San Juan, Puerto Rico: Atabex, 1981). Las mujeres no hablan así, a poetic and artistic collaboration with Yolanda V. Fundora, is the first openly lesbian poetry collection in Puerto Rican literature. Renewed interest in Las mujeres led to a second edition in 2010, followed by recent publications of English translations of poems from the collection in various online magazines and literary journals.

A fragment of Matos Cintrón's first novel El amordio de Amanda, dealing with growing up in the 1960s in urban Puerto Rico, was included in the LGBT Puerto Rican literary anthology Los Otros Cuerpos (San Juan, Puerto Rico: Tiempo Nuevo, 2007).

In 2014, Matos Cintrón and Fundora published another collaborative collection titled El arte de morir y la pequeña muerte. This collection is the product of a 1991 art installation in San Juan, Puerto Rico and represents an homage to friends who died from AIDS, including her poem "A Manuel Ramos Otero." Also included in this work is a sketch by artist Joaquín Reyes (1949-1994) and a poem by Ana Irma Rivera Lassén, an Afro-Puerto Rican attorney, human rights activist, and feminist.

Aliens in NYC (2012, Atabex), Matos Cintrón's full-length book of poetry, deals with the subject of migration.

== Works ==
- Las mujeres no hablan así. San Juan, Puerto Rico: Editorial Atabex, 1981. Second edition, 2010. ISBN 978-0-557-40784-2
- A través del aire y del fuego pero no del cristal. San Juan, Puerto Rico: Editorial Atabex, 1981.
- El arte de morir y la pequeña muerte. New Jersey: Editorial Atabex, 2014. ISBN 978-1495493867
- Aliens in NYC. New Jersey: Editorial Atabex, 2014. ISBN 978-1500750756

== See also ==
- List of lesbian literature
- List of Puerto Rican writers
- Puerto Rican literature

== Sources ==
- Colón Zayas, Eliseo R. "Insólito y los monstruos del espectador." El Mundo, Puerto Rico Ilustrado, 13 May 1990, pp. 14–16.
- Cordero, Margarita. "La mujer migrante." El Mundo, Puerto Rico Ilustrado, 13 May 1990.
- Echeandía, Servando. "Sobre Nemir Matos." Reintegro, April 1983, p. 12.
- Matos Cintrón, Nemir. "On Women's Experimental Film." 1990 Film Festival sponsored by the Puerto Rican Atheneum, published in Cineasta, no date.
- Ramos Otero, Manuel. "La luna ultrajada." Claridad, Puerto Rico, 1981.
- Velázquez, Rosa. "Nemir Matos Cintrón." Siempre, 13–26 November 2003, p. 18.
