= Lana Citron =

Irish novelist, short story writer, poet, screenwriter

- Born: 1969 (age 56–57); Ireland

Lana Citron (born 1969) is an Irish novelist, poet, short story writer, and screenwriter whose work has won awards.

== Biography ==
Lana Citron was born in Ireland in 1969. She was educated at Trinity College, Dublin.

Citron has written several novels. She has also written poetry and short stories, while her short films have won awards including The Pears Foundation Award 2012. She was also a judge for The Pears Foundation Award in 2013. One of her short films is about a young Jewish girl's Holy communion which is based on the author's own Jewish faith.

A trained actress, Citron has also appeared in a variety of plays and in stand-up comedy. In 2004, she appeared in Four Queens Poker Show at the Edinburgh Festival.

Citron has written for radio and magazines, and has worked for the Huffington Post.

Citron has two sons and lives in Maida Vale, London.

== Bibliography ==
=== Novels ===
- Sucker (1998)
- Spilt Milk (2001)
- Transit (2002)
- The Brodsky Touch (2007)
- The Honey Trap (2007)

=== Non fiction ===
- A Compendium of Kisses (2010)
- A Gastronomy of Kisses (2011)
- A Taste of Love and Desire

=== Short films ===
- ‘I was the Cigarette Girl,’
- ‘Hannah Cohen’s Holy Communion’

=== Radio play ===
- ‘Love Saboteur’.
