= José Figueroa Sancha =

Former superintendent of the Puerto Rico Police Department

- Police career
- Country: Puerto Rico
- Department: Puerto Rico Police Department
- Rank: Superintendent (January 2, 2009 - July 2, 2011)

José Figueroa Sancha is a former superintendent of the Puerto Rico Police Department and former deputy director of the Federal Bureau of Investigation in Puerto Rico. After being appointed by governor of Puerto Rico Luis Fortuño as superintendent in 2008, he resigned in 2011 amidst criticisms in the middle of a crime wave in the island.

== Career with the FBI ==
He joined the FBI in 1986. He served as a liaison officer at the U.S. Embassy in the Dominican Republic. As deputy director of the FBI in Puerto Rico, Figueroa Sancha was one of the people in charge of the operative where Filiberto Ojeda Ríos was killed in September 2005. He was also the agent in charge of an operative at an apartment building in Río Piedras where agents pushed and shoved members of the press, spraying them with pepper spray. The incident caused a lot of commotion amongst the press community and the Puerto Rico Press Association and the Overseas Press Club sued the FBI. José Figueroa Sancha retired from the FBI on December 31, 2008.

== Career as superintendent ==
In 1993, then-Superintendent Pedro Toledo appointed him deputy associate director of the Police. In November 2009, Puerto Rico Governor-elect Luis Fortuño named Figueroa Sancha as superintendent of the Puerto Rico Police Department, and he was confirmed by the Senate in January.

During 2010, Figueroa Sancha dealt with numerous riots and incidents involving students of the University of Puerto Rico and members of the police. These were as a result of a student's strike against new policies from the university administration and the government.

In 2011, the rate of murders in Puerto Rico increased rapidly, which led many sectors to ask for Figueroa Sancha's resignation. Figueroa Sancha officially resigned on July 2, 2011, after less than three years in his position, after criticism for his work and the lack of positive results under his command. Allegedly, the governor asked him to resign, but this was denied by the government. Puerto Rico recorded its second-worst year for killings under his watch in 2010, while 2011 is currently the worst in the history of the island.

== Political aspirations ==
After his resignation, Figueroa Sancha admitted that he had been approached by leaders of the PNP, Thomas Rivera Schatz and Héctor O'Neill, for a possible aspiration to the Senate of Puerto Rico. However, Jorge Santini, mayor of San Juan, didn't support him. Two days later, Figueroa Sancha announced that he wouldn't run for the Senate and would instead dedicate his time to a private security company he had started.

Police appointments
Preceded by Agustín Cartagena Díaz	Superintendent of the Puerto Rico Police Department	Succeeded by José L. Rivera (interim)
