= Pedro Cintrón =

Puerto Rican basketball coach

Pedro Cintrón is a Puerto Rican basketball coach, currently with the Maratonistas de Coamo of the Baloncesto Superior Nacional league.

In the 2007 season, Cintrón was the assistant coach of Guillermo Vecchio for the Maratonistas. Vecchio, however, quit the team after a 2-12 start. Cintrón then took over and finished the season with a 9-21 record. After that season, the Maratonistas were forced to recess due to financial problems, and Cintrón became assistant coach for the Leones de Ponce.

In 2010, Cintrón started as interim coach for Ponce while Manolo Cintrón fulfilled previous compromises in a Mexican basketball league. During that period, Pedro led the team to a 5-0 start. After Manolo was fired, Pedro became head coach of the Leones and led them to the quarterfinals. They were eliminated by the Cangrejeros de Santurce in a fifth decisive game.

Cintrón was born in Ponce, Puerto Rico.
