= Recreational Trails Program =

US federal assistance program

The Recreational Trails Program (RTP) is a federal assistance program of the United States Department of Transportation's Federal Highway Administration (FHWA). It provides funds to the States to develop and maintain recreational trails and trail-related facilities for both nonmotorized and motorized recreational trail uses.

The RTP funds come from the Federal Highway Trust Fund, and represent a portion of the motor fuel excise tax collected from nonhighway recreational fuel use: fuel used for off-highway recreation by snowmobiles, all-terrain vehicles, off-highway motorcycles, and off-highway light trucks. The Congress authorized the RTP for $60 million in 2005, $70 million in 2006, $75 million in 2007, $80 million in 2008, and $85 million 2009.

== Background ==
On July 6, 2012 a two-year surface transportation agreement, called MAP-21, was signed into law. The Recreational Trails Program is continued intact with funding set at $85 million a year for Fiscal Years 2013 and 2014.

The RTP funds are distributed to the States by legislative formula: half of the funds are distributed equally among all States, and half are distributed in proportion to the estimated amount of nonhighway recreational fuel use in each State. Each State administers its own program, usually through a State resource or park agency. Each State develops its own procedures to solicit and select projects for funding.

Recreational Trails Program funds may be used for:

- Maintenance and restoration of existing trails.
- Development and rehabilitation of trailside and trailhead facilities and trail linkages.
- Purchase and lease of trail construction and maintenance equipment.
- Construction of new trails (with restrictions for new trails on Federal lands).
- Acquisition of easements or property for trails.
- Assessment of trail conditions for accessibility and maintenance.

Recreational Trails Program funds may not be used for:

- Property condemnation (eminent domain)
- Constructing new trails for motorized use on National Forest or Bureau of Land Management lands unless the project is consistent with resource management plans
- Facilitating motorized access on otherwise nonmotorized trails.

States must use 30% of their funds for motorized trail uses, 30% for nonmotorized trail uses, and 40% for diverse trail uses. Diverse motorized projects (such as snowmobile and motorcycle) or diverse nonmotorized projects (such as pedestrian and equestrian) may satisfy two of these categories at the same time. States are encouraged to consider projects that benefit both motorized and nonmotorized users, such as common trailhead facilities.

Other uses of funds specifically allowed are:

- Development and dissemination of publications and operation of educational programs to promote safety and environmental protection related to trails (including supporting non-law enforcement trail safety and trail use monitoring patrol programs, and providing trail-related training) (limited to 5% of a State's funds).
- State administrative costs related to this program (limited to 7% of a State's funds).
