= Citronelle Railroad Historic District =

Historic district in Alabama, United States

- U.S. National Register of Historic Places
- U.S. Historic district
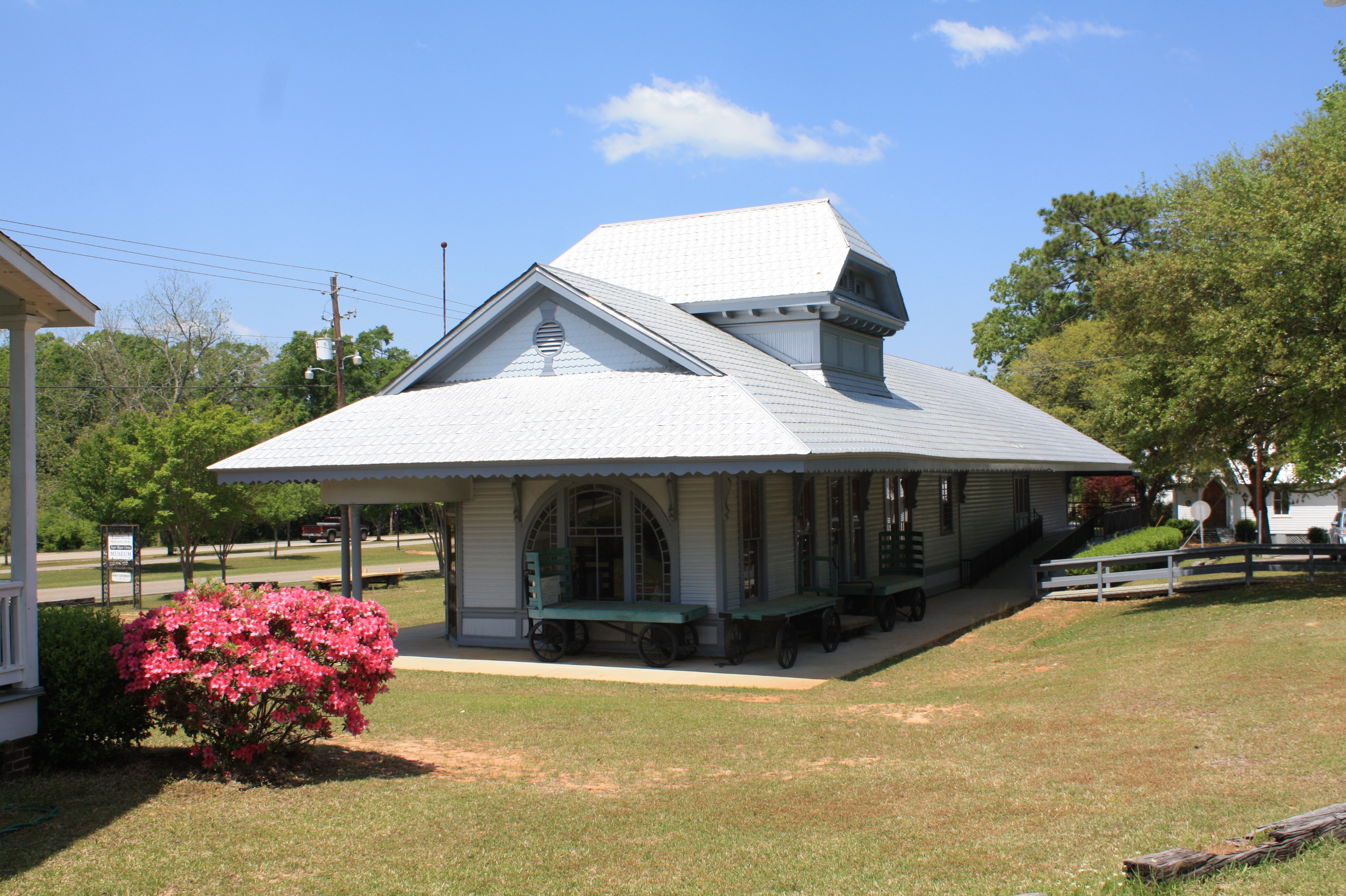
- The former Mobile and Ohio Railroad Depot in the heart of the district

- Location within Alabama Location within the United States
- Location: Roughly Centre and Main from Union to Faye, Citronelle, Alabama
- Coordinates: 31°5′14″N 88°13′39″W
- Area: 42.3 acres (17.1 ha)
- Architectural style: Late Victorian
- NRHP reference No.: 89002421
- Added to NRHP: January 25, 1990

The Citronelle Railroad Historic District is a historic district in Citronelle, Alabama, United States. It is roughly bounded by Centre and Main streets from Union to Faye streets. The district covers 42.3 acres (0.171 km^{2}) and contains 28 contributing properties. It was placed on the National Register of Historic Places on January 25, 1990.

The Citronelle Walking Trail passes through the district.
