= Michelle Citron =

American filmmaker

- Born: 1948; Boston, Massachusetts
- Years active: 1973 to present
- Website: http://www.michellecitron.com

Michelle Citron (born 1948, Boston, Massachusetts) is a film, video and multimedia artist, scholar and author.

== Early life ==
Michelle Citron was born in Boston, Massachusetts. She attended the University of Massachusetts, earning a B.S. in Psychology. She has an Interdisciplinary Ph.D. in cognitive studies and aesthetics from the University of Wisconsin-Madison. Citron was a Professor of Radio/Television/Film at Northwestern University from 1978 to 2006, where she also served as Associate Dean of The Graduate School and Chair of the Department of Radio/Television/Film. She was Chair of the Interdisciplinary Arts Department, Columbia College Chicago from 2006-2012.

== Career ==
Citron's films explore the lives of women – mothers and daughters, women in the workplace, the trauma of incest, lesbian culture – as well as ethnic identity. These works, influenced by avant-garde film and feminism, blend experimental styles with melodrama and an exploration of the border between documentary and fiction. This experimentation continues with a series of more recent interactive narratives as well as her writing, particularly her book, Home Movies and Other Necessary Fictions.

== Filmography (partial list) ==
Year	Title	Length	Description
1973	Self-Defense	4 minutes	Experimental Film
1973	Integration	8 minutes	Experimental Film
1975	Parthenogenesis	25 minutes	Experimental documentary about two women violinists: a student and her teacher.
1978	Daughter Rite	55 minutes	A feminist pseudo-documentary about mothers and daughters, it has been called " a classic, the missing link between the 'Direct Cinema' documentaries and the later hybrids that acknowledged truth couldn't always be found in front of a camera lens."
1983	What You Take for Granted…	75 minutes	A fiction/documentary hybrid about women who work in traditionally male jobs, both working class and professional.
1983	Mother Rite	25 minutes	A documentary video about Citron's mother who worked for many years at Hamburger Mary's, a famous gay bar and restaurant in Honolulu.
2014	Leftovers	25 minutes	An experimental documentary about two women who lived together in Chicago for almost fifty years. Leftovers explores the hidden trajectory of lives lived at the margins through the snapshots left behind.Leftovers is the fourth, and final, course in Queer Feast. See Multimedia.
2017	Lives:Visible	35 minutes	An essay/documentary. 2000 snapshots taken over four decades by a close group of lesbian friends reveal the rich history of butch/fem working class life in pre-Stonewall Chicago.

== Multimedia ==
Since 1999, Citron has explored new ways to experience story with a series interactive narratives that collectively comprise Queerfeast.com. Each piece in the series is a distinct work; collectively they create a multi-course meal of lesbian life played out through its pleasures, complications, and contradictions.

Year	Title	Description
1999	As American As Apple Pie	What happens after the first kiss is over? A typical American love story about food, family, work, compromises, and adultery. Twenty-two scenes randomly accessed reveal a different trajectory of Cilla's and Lucille's relationship each time the piece is player. Along the way you learn how to make an apple pie.
2001	Cocktails & Appetizers	A vibrant and sexy homage to lesbian pulp fiction of the 1950s. We eavesdrop at a cocktail party and from the swirling snippets of gossip construct a story of Max and Jesse falling into lust and love.
2002	Jewish Looks	A meditation on four family photos and the myths, history, and desires that surround them.
2004	Mixed Greens	A do-it-yourself movie about identity, belonging, and the things we desire. A salad of forty-eight scenes tosses together two stories: four generations of Citron's Irish Jewish heritage played against four decades of lesbian life in America, challenging our ideas of the rewards and price of assimilation.
2014	Leftovers	The only linear work in the series, is the final course.

== Bibliography ==
Citron is the author of Home Movies and Other Necessary Fictions, a hybrid memoir. The book examines the relationship between history and memory, psyche and art, non-fiction and imagination, memory and aesthetic strategies. Joe Bonomo, in The Georgia Review, called it "a uniquely powerful book… The result is nothing short of an illuminating cross-genre deconstruction of childhood myth and fantasy, representation and objectively."

The book was awarded the Krasna-Krause Moving Image Book Award, Special Commendation 1999 (International). The award jury cited the book for being "an extraordinary blend of autobiographical and film writing which offers a radical new way of thinking and writing about film." It won two additional awards: The Kovacs Book Award, Society for Cinema Studies 1999, Special Commendation; and Outstanding Book Award, Organization for the study of Communication, Language and Gender 1999.

Citron is also the author of numerous book chapters and articles including:

- "Slipping the Borders/Shifting the Fragments," in There She Goes: Feminist Filmmaking and Beyond, ed. Corinne Columpar & Sophie Mayer, Wayne State University Press, 2009
- "Fleeing from Documentary: The Ethics of Autobiographical Filmmaking," in Feminism and Documentary, ed. Diane Waldman and Janet Walker, University of Minnesota Press, 1999
- "Women's Film Production: Going Mainstream," in The Female Spectator: Looking at Film and TV, ed. E. DeidrePribram, Verso Press, London and Routledge, Chapman & Hart. 1988
