= Michelle Fraley =

First Puerto Rican woman to graduate from the United States Military Academy at West Point

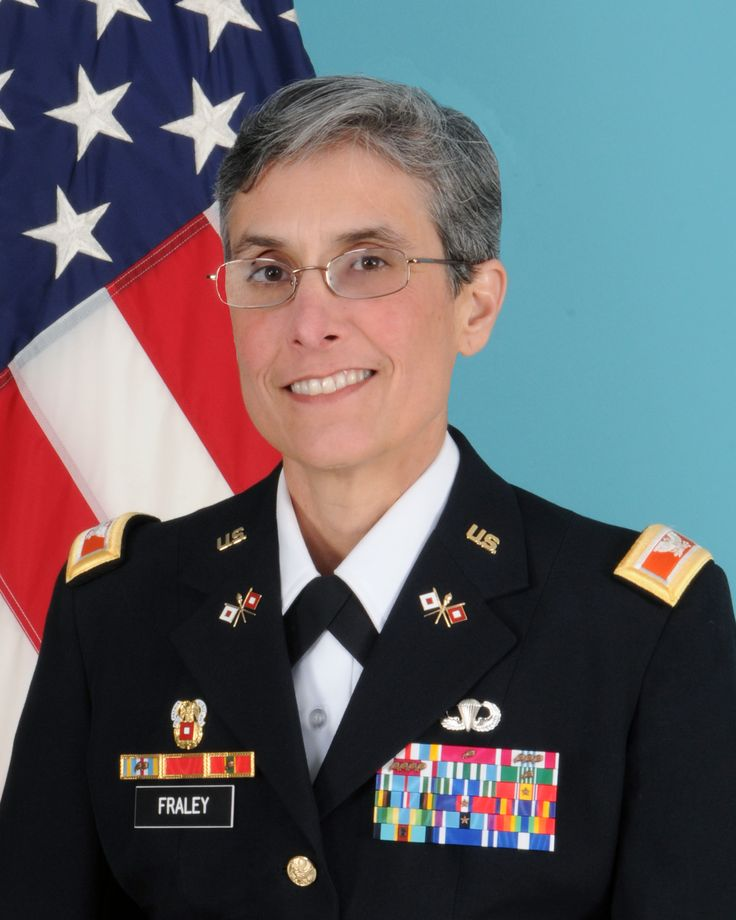
- Born: Michelle Hernández; 1962 (age 63–64); San Juan, Puerto Rico
- Education: West Point Military Academy (B.Sc.); Troy University (M.A.); Nova Southeastern University (M.B.A.); University of Phoenix (Ph.D.)
- Spouse: Tom Fraley
- Military career
- Allegiance: United States
- Branch: United States Army
- Service years: 1980–2014 (33–34 years)
- Rank: Colonel
- Commands: DISA-Europe; Army Network Enterprise Technology Command; Warrior Transition Brigade; 69th Signal Battalion

Michelle Fraley

Superintendent Puerto Rico Police
- In office January 2, 2017 – January 8, 2018
- Governor: Ricardo Rosselló

Personal details
- Born: Michelle Hernández de Fraley
- Cabinet: 17th Cabinet of Puerto Rico

Michelle Fraley (née Hernández) is a retired military officer and was the Superintendent of the Puerto Rico Police. Fraley is also the first Puerto Rican woman to graduate from West Point Military Academy and the first woman to hold the aforementioned post of superintendent. She is also the former chief of staff of the Army Network Enterprise Technology Command. She was also Battalion Commander, 69th Signal Battalion and Brigade Commander at the Defense Information Systems Agency DISA-Europe in Stuttgart, Germany. Academically, Fraley holds a Master of Business Administration (MBA) from Nova Southeastern University, a Master of Arts (M.A.) in International Relations and Affairs from Troy University, and a Ph.D. in organizational leadership from the University of Phoenix.

Fraley retired from the United States Army in 2014 after 30 years of service. Her final of six commanding posts before retiring was as commander of the Walter Reed Army Medical Center Warrior Transition Brigade (WTB) in the National Capital Area. As she completed her final post, she was described as a "Wonder Woman" in dealing with wounded warriors that returned from the battlefront to assume other roles in the military or transition into private life.

After her Army retirement, she returned to her homeland of Puerto Rico. Upon her return, she was appointed as special assistant to the Superintendent of the Puerto Rico Police, leading the Strategic Initiative Group. In this capacity, Fraley was charged with analyzing the entire state police organization. After Ricardo Rosselló won the 2016 Puerto Rico general elections, Governor elect Roselló nominated her for Superintendent of the Puerto Rico Police. Fraley resigned on January 8, 2018. She has been Corporate Security Director since 2021 for LUMA Energy.

== Military awards ==
- Defense Superior Service Medal
- Legion of Merit with one oak leaf cluster
- Defense Meritorious Service Medal with three oak leaf clusters
- Meritorious Service Medal
- Joint Service Commendation Medal
- Army Commendation Medal with one oak leaf cluster
- Joint Service Achievement Medal
- Joint Meritorious Unit Award with one oak leaf cluster
- Army Meritorious Unit Commendation
- Army Superior Unit Award
- National Defense Service Medal with one bronce Service star
- Armed Forces Expeditionary Medal
- Kosovo Campaign Medal
- Global War on Terrorism Service Medal
- Armed Forces Service Medal
- Humanitarian Service Medal
- Army Service Ribbon
- Army Overseas Service Ribbon
- NATO Medal (Yugoslavia)
- NATO Medal (Kosovo)

Badges:

- Parachutist badge
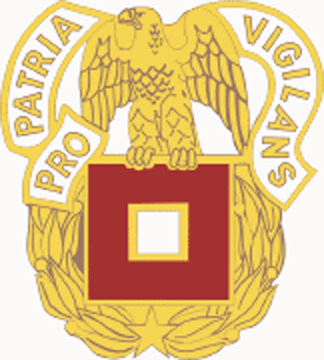
- Regimental Insignia

== See also ==
- History of women in Puerto Rico
- List of Puerto Rican military personnel
- Puerto Rican women in the military
