= Samuel Leib Zitron =

Hebrew and Yiddish writer, historian, and literary critic

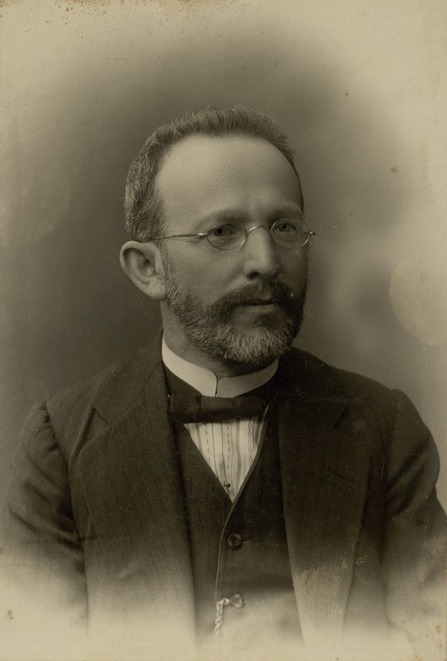
- Born: May 16, 1860; Minsk, Russian Empire
- Died: November 8, 1930 (aged 70)
- Writing career
- Language: Hebrew, Yiddish

Samuel Leib Zitron (Hebrew: שְׁמוּאֵל לֶיְבּ צִיטְרוֹן; May 16, 1860 – November 8, 1930), also known as S. L. Citron, was a Hebrew and Yiddish writer, historian, and literary critic. He contributed to the Yiddish press and to nearly all the Hebrew periodicals in the Diaspora over 50 years.

== Biography ==
Samuel Leib Zitron was born in Minsk, Russian Empire to Chana and Ya'akov Zitron, a merchant who died when Samuel Leib was ten years old. Zitron entered the Wolozhin Yeshiva at the age of 13, where he was the youngest of a class of 300. Attracted to the Haskalah, he made his first appearance as a Hebrew author at the age of fourteen in the periodical Ha-Maggid. He briefly moved to Vienna in 1876, where he befriended editor Peretz Smolenskin, and shortly thereafter began studies at the Jewish Theological Seminary of Breslau. He left for Prostken in 1882—where he worked as a teacher of Hebrew—and returned to Minsk the following year to devote himself to Jewish literature and publishing. He joined the staff of Ha-Maggid and also contributed to Ha-Shachar.

He joined Ḥibbat Zion in its early days, and in 1884 translated Leon Pinsker's Auto-Emancipation from German into Hebrew, under the title Im en ani li mi li. He translated other (mainly Yiddish) works into Hebrew, including works by Lev Levanda, Selig Schachnowitz, S. Ansky, and Heinrich Graetz.

During the 1890s, Zitron's articles appeared in the major Hebrew newspapers and journals, including Ha-Melitz, Ha-Shiloaḥ, and Luaḥ Aḥi’asaf. From 1904 Zitron lived in Vilna and edited various newspapers and anthologies. He began his Yiddish writing in 1915.

== Literary career ==
In the 1880s to 1890s, Zitron wrote short stories, one of which, Yonah Potah ('A Naïve Dove', 1887), aroused popular attention. Notable also are his Asifat sipurim me-ḥaye bene Yisra’el ('A Collection of Stories from the Lives of Jews' 1885), a collection of short stories translated from the German and French, and Mi-Shuk ha-ḥayim ('From Life’s Marketplace', 1887). Others works of fiction include Abraham ben Joseph, a translation of Levanda's Russian historical novel Abraham Jesophovich, and Yonah Fotah ('Foolish Dove', 1888).

He completed his major work, Leksikon Tziyyoni, in 1924, which provides the biographies of major Zionist figures. Zitron's main works in Hebrew also include Toledot Ḥibbat Ẓiyyon ('The History of Ḥibat Tsiyon', 1913), on the Zionist movement and its precursors; Herzl, ḥayav u-fe‘ulotav ('Herzl, His Life and His Activities', 1921); Yotzerei ha-Sifrut ha-Ivrit ha-Ḥadashah ('Creators of the New Hebrew Literature', 1922), on Hebrew literature and its writers; and Anashim ve-Soferim ('Men and Writers', 1921). In Yiddish, Zitron published Geshikhte fun der yidisher prese (1923), on the history of the 19th century Yiddish press; Shtadlonim: Interesante yidishe tipen fun noenten over ('Intercessors: Interesting Jewish Characters from the Recent Past', 1926); and Barimte yidishe froyen ('Famous Jewish Women' 1928).

Of his literary and critical essays the following are the most important: "Mapu and Smolensky," a critical estimate of their works; "The Development of Hebrew Literature in Russia During the Nineteenth Century," in Otzar ha-Sifrut, vol. ii.; "Ha-Sifrut ve ha-Ḥayyim" ('Literature and Life'), in Pardes, vols. i. and ii.; "Life of Levanda" (1897) in Aḥiasaf; and "Ha-Meshorer be-Ḥayyav ube-Moto" ('The Poet Living and Dead', 1900) in Aḥiasaf.
