= James Tuller =

Former Superintendent of the Puerto Rico Police

Superintendent of the Puerto Rico Police
- In office December 1, 2013 – April 2, 2014
- Governor: Alejandro García Padilla
- Preceded by: Héctor Pesquera
- Succeeded by: Col. Juan Rodríguez - Acting

Commissioner of Safety and Public Protection
- In office December 1, 2013 – April 2, 2014
- Governor: Alejandro García Padilla
- Preceded by: Héctor Pesquera

Chief New York City Police Department Transportation Bureau
- In office 2009 – November 30, 2012

Personal details
- Born: James Tuller Cintrón New York City, New York
- Education: John Jay College of Criminal Justice (BA, MPA)
- Occupation: policeman
- Cabinet: 16th Cabinet of Puerto Rico

James Tuller Cintrón (Note: In this Spanish name, the first or paternal surname is Tuller and the second or maternal family name is Cintrón.) was the designated Puerto Rico Police Superintendent from December 2013 – April 2014, Tuller asked that his nomination as head of the PRPD be withdrawn so he could attend to personal matters. Prior to joining the PRPD, Tuller was the Chief of the New York City Police Department Transportation Bureau. Tuller has been a policeman since 1973 and holds a bachelor's degree in political science from John Jay College of Criminal Justice and a master's degree in public administration.

== See also ==
- List of superintendents of the Puerto Rico Police
