= Citronella =

Citronella may refer to:

- Cymbopogon nardus, or citronella grass
  - Citronella oil, insect-repelling essential oil
- Citronella (genus), of trees and shrubs
- "Citronella", a song by Aesop Rock from the 2007 album None Shall Pass

== See also ==
- Citronellal, a component in the compounds that give citronella oil its distinctive lemon scent
- Citronellol, a natural chemical found in citronella oils
- Citronelle (disambiguation)
- Lasius, a genus of formicine ants commonly known as citronella ants
- Pelargonium 'citrosum', or citrosa geranium, a perennial subshrub with fragrant leaves
