= Salixto Medina =

Puerto Rican lawyer

Salixto Medina Malave
- Born: Isabela, Puerto Rico
- Occupation: Lawyer
- Title: Former assistant United States attorney for Puerto Rico

Salixto Medina Malave is a Puerto Rican lawyer. He was the Assistant United States Attorney for the District of Puerto Rico. He also served reaching the rank Coronel as State Judge Advocate in the Puerto Rico National Guard.

He was involved in a number of important cases.

== See also ==
- List of Puerto Ricans
