= Juan José Medina Lamela =

United States Air Force general

Juan J. Medina
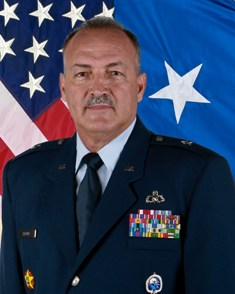
- Brigadier General Juan J. Medina; 19th Adjutant General of Puerto Rico
- Born: Juan José Medina Lamela; Quebradillas, Puerto Rico
- Military career
- Allegiance: United States of America
- Branch: Puerto Rico Air National Guard
- Service years: 1980-2012 (PR ANG) 2013-2014 (PR Adjutant General)
- Rank: Brigadier General
- Unit: 156th Airlift Wing
- Commands: Adjutant General of the Puerto Rico National Guard
- Awards: Meritorious Service Medal (1); Air Force Achievement Medal

Juan José Medina Lamela (Note: In this Spanish name, the first or paternal surname is Medina and the second or maternal family name is Lamela.) Was the 19th Puerto Rico Adjutant General, and the commanding officer of the Puerto Rico National Guard and held the rank of brigadier general. Medina was born in Quebradillas, Puerto Rico, was a Boy Scout of the troop 92 of Quebradillas. Has bachelor's degree in mathematics with a concentration in Statistics from the University of Puerto Rico.

His military education includes the academy of military sciences at McGhee Tyson Air National Guard Base in Tennessee; the squadron officers school at Maxwell Air Force Base in Alabama; the air command and State College, correspondence; and the Inter-American Defense College in Fort McNair in Washington, D.C. Medina Lamela retired from the Air National Guard in 2012 as a Coronel..

Medina came out of retirement when Puerto Rico governor Alejandro García Padilla appointed him as the Puerto Rico National Guard Adjutant General and was promoted to the rank of Brigadier General. Stepped down as Puerto Rico National Guard Adjutant General in October 2014.

== Awards and decorations ==
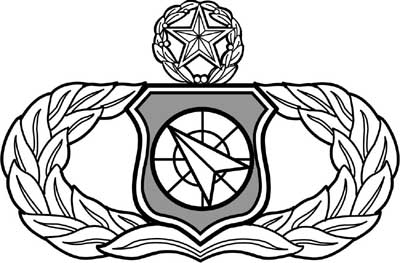
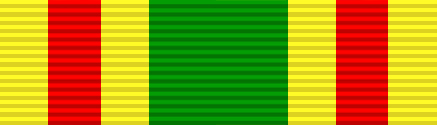
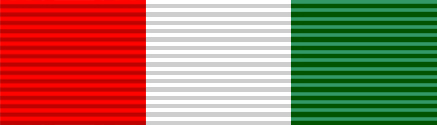
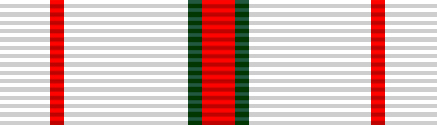
Weapons Director Badge
Meritorious Service Medal with one Oak leaf cluster
Air Force Achievement Medal
Air Force Outstanding Unit Award
Air Force Organizational Excellence Award
Combat Readiness Medal with four Oak leaf clusters
National Defense Service Medal with bronze Service star
Armed Forces Expeditionary Medal
Global War on Terrorism Service Medal
Humanitarian Service Medal
Air Force Overseas Short Tour Service Ribbon
Air Force Expeditionary Service Ribbon with gold frame with one Oak leaf cluster
Air Force Longevity Service Award with seven Oak leaf clusters
Armed Forces Reserve Medal with Hourglass device, "M" device and bronze award numeral 3
Small Arms Expert Marksmanship Ribbon
Air Force Training Ribbon
Puerto Rico Merit Cross with two oak leaf clusters
Puerto Rico Service Medal with four oak leaf clusters
Puerto Rico Disaster Relief Ribbon

== See also ==
- List of Puerto Rican military personnel
- Puerto Rico Adjutant General

== Notes ==
Military offices
Preceded by Major General Antonio J. Vicens	Adjutant General of the Puerto Rico National Guard; Under Governor Alejandro Garcia Padilla; 2013-2014	Succeeded by Major General Marta Carcana
