= PRNG =

PRNG may refer to:

- Pseudorandom number generator
- Puerto Rico National Guard
