= Isabelo Rivera =

United States Army general

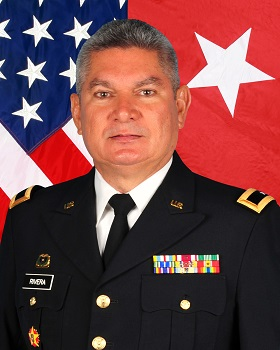
- Born: 1956 (age 69–70); Las Piedras, Puerto Rico
- Military career
- Allegiance: United States of America
- Branch: Army National Guard
- Service years: 1976–2019
- Rank: Brigadier general
- Commands: 292nd Corps Support Battalion; Adjutant General of the Puerto Rico National Guard
- Awards: Defense Superior Service Medal; Meritorious Service Medal (1)

Isabelo Rivera Negrón (born 1956) was the 21st Puerto Rico Adjutant General, and the commanding officer of the Puerto Rico National Guard.

== Early years and education ==
Isabelo Rivera was born in Las Piedras, Puerto Rico. Has a BA in economics from the University of Puerto Rico, Río Piedras Campus, MBA in Management from the Metropolitan University of Puerto Rico and a juris doctor from the Interamerican University of Puerto Rico School of Law. Also attended the Inter-American Defense College at Fort Lesley J. McNair and the United States Army Command and General Staff College. Resident Senior Service College Dual Status Commanders Course (NORTHCOM) and the Joint Task Force Commanders Course.

== National Guard career ==
Commissioned as a 2nd lieutenant thru the Army ROTC program on June 7, 1976 in the Puerto Rico National Guard. His first assignment was as an Assistant Finance Officer, Alpha Company, 192d Support Battalion, Puerto Rico Army National Guard in San Juan, Puerto Rico. Certified Defense Financial Manager (CDFM) American Association of Military Comptrollers. Was appointed Adjutant General for the Puerto Rico National Guard on January 17, 2017, by Puerto Rico Governor Ricardo Rosselló. During his tenure as Adjutant General of the Puerto Rico National Guard, Rivera led the PRNG during the recovery relief efforts after the path of Hurricane Maria thru Puerto Rico. Isabelo Rivera resigned the position as Puerto Rico Adjutant General to retire from the Puerto Rico National Guard after 42 years of military service.

- July 1976 – June 1977: Assistant Finance Officer, Alpha Company, 192nd Support Battalion, Puerto Rico Army National Guard, San Juan, Puerto Rico
- July 1977 – September 1977: Finance Officer Basic Course, United States of America Institute of Administration, Fort Benjamin Harrison, Indiana
- December 1977 – November 1977: Assistant Finance Officer, Alpha Company, 192nd Support Battalion, Puerto Rico Army National Guard, San Juan, Puerto Rico
- December 1979 – November 1982: Military Pay Officer, 192nd Support Battalion, Puerto Rico Army National Guard, San Juan, Puerto Rico
- December 1982 – March 1985: Deputy Finance Officers, Joint Forces Headquarters, Puerto Rico Army National Guard, San Juan, Puerto Rico
- August 1985 – November 1986: Company Commander, A Company, 192nd Support Battalion, Puerto Rico Army National Guard, San Juan, Puerto Rico
- November 1986 – October 1987: Finance Officer, 192nd Support Battalion, Puerto Rico Army National Guard, San Juan, Puerto Rico
- October 1987 – July 1988: Budget Officer, Joint Forces Headquarters, Puerto Rico Army National Guard, San Juan, Puerto Rico
- July 1988 – November 1988: Student, Finance Officer Advanced Course, Finance School Fort Benjamin Harrison, Indiana.
- November 1988 – August 1994: Comptroller, Headquarters State Area Command, Puerto Rico Army National Guard, San Juan, Puerto Rico
- August 1994 – May 1997: Logistic Division Chief, Headquarters State Area Command, Puerto Rico Army National Guard, San Juan, Puerto Rico
- June 1997 – October 1998: Battalion Commander, 292nd Corps Support Battalion, Rico Army National Guard, San Juan, Puerto Rico
- August 1998 – June 2000: Comptroller, Joint Forces Headquarters, Puerto Rico Army National Guard, San Juan, Puerto Rico
- July 2000 – June 2001: Student, Inter American Defense College, Fort Lesley J. McNair, Washington, District of Columbia
- July 2001 – September 2001: Comptroller, Joint Forces Headquarters, Puerto Rico Army National Guard, San Juan, Puerto Rico
- September 2001 – September 2002: Chief, Post Mobilization State, Joint Forces Headquarters, Puerto Rico Army National Guard, San Juan, Puerto Rico
- October 2002 – July 2005: Director Fiscal and Property, Joint Forces Headquarters, Puerto Rico Army National Guard, San Juan, Puerto Rico
- July 2005 – January 2007: Deputy Chief of Staff of Logistic, Joint Forces Headquarters, Puerto Rico Army National Guard, San Juan, Puerto Rico
- January 2007 – March 2008: Chief, Joint Staff, Joint Forces Headquarters, Puerto Rico Army National Guard, San Juan, Puerto Rico
- April 2008 – June 2013: United States Property and Fiscal for Puerto Rico, US Army Field Element National Guard Bureau, Arlington, Virginia
- June 2013 – November 2014: Assistant Adjutant General, Joint Forces Headquarters, San Juan, Puerto Rico
- November 2014 – January 2017: Commander, Land Component Command, Puerto Rico
- January 2017 – February 2019: Puerto Rico National Guard Adjutant General, San Juan, Puerto Rico

== Military awards and decorations ==
	Defense Superior Service Medal
Width-44 crimson ribbon with two width-8 white stripes at distance 4 from the edges.	Meritorious Service Medal with bronze (with 1 Oak Leaf Cluster)
	Army Commendation Medal
	Army Achievement Medal
	Army Reserve Component Achievement Medal (with 2 Silver Oak Leaf Clusters)
	National Defense Service Medal (with one bronze service star)
	Global War on Terrorism Service Medal
	Humanitarian Service Medal
	Armed Forces Reserve Medal (with Gold Hourglass and "M" Device)
	Army Service Ribbon

== Effective dates of promotions ==
Promotions
Insignia	Rank	Date
	Brigadier General	July 31, 2014
	Colonel	October 18, 2001
	Lieutenant Colonel	January 27, 1995
	Major	February 14, 1990
	Captain	September 28, 1983
	First Lieutenant	June 6, 1979
	Second Lieutenant	June 7, 1976

== See also ==
- List of Puerto Rican military personnel
- Puerto Rico Adjutant General

Military offices
Preceded by Major General Marta Carcana	Adjutant General of the Puerto Rico National Guard; Under Governor Ricardo Rosselló; 2017–2019	Succeeded by Brigadier General José J. Reyes
