= Marta Carcana =

First female Adjutant General of the Puerto Rico National Guard

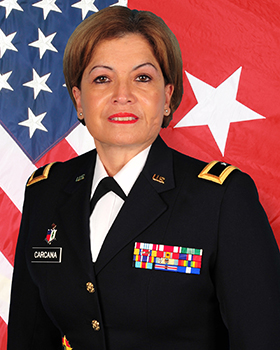
- Born: 1958 (age 67–68); Bayamón, Puerto Rico
- Military career
- Allegiance: United States
- Branch: United States Army Reserve; Army National Guard
- Service years: 1986–2017
- Rank: Major general
- Unit: 101st Troop Command
- Commands: Adjutant General of the Puerto Rico National Guard
- Awards: Defense Meritorious Service Medal; Meritorious Service Medal

Marta Carcana is a retired United States Army officer. The former Adjutant General of the Puerto Rico National Guard, she served during the administration of Governor Alejandro Garcia Padilla from 2015 to 2017 and was the first woman to hold the position.

== Early life and education ==
Carcana was born in Bayamón, Puerto Rico. She graduated from Eastern District High School in Brooklyn, New York. She has an associate degree in nursing from New York City College of Technology and a bachelor's degree from the Metropolitan University of Puerto Rico and a master's degree in business administration from the University Central of Michigan in Puerto Rico. General Carcana received her direct commission as second lieutenant in 1986. She has an MS in Strategic Studies from the United States Army War College.

== Career ==
Carcana began her broad and extensive military career in the 1986 in United States Army Reserve serving as a clinical nurse with the MC HSP FLD (HUB), at Capt. Eurípides Rubio United States Army Reserve Center in Puerto Nuevo, Puerto Rico. Entered the Puerto Rico National Guard in 1996, served as RSS Chief, 101st Troop Command FWD, San Juan, Puerto Rico, Pristina Kosovo, Military Assistant to Chief of Staff and military missions as a nurse. In October 2014, Carcana was appointed Acting-Adjutant General of the Puerto Rico National Guard, after the resignation of Brigadier General Juan José Medina Lamela. MG Marta Carcana retired from the military in 2017. She is still involved with the veteran community as Vice Commander American Legion Post 19 in Cayey, Puerto Rico and Vets EDU Outreach Director.

- Jan 2017 – Mar 2017 Director, Joint Staff – (PR) Joint Force Headquarters (JFHQ), Joint Force Headquarters, San Juan, Puerto Rico
- Jul 2015 – Jan 2017 The Adjutant General, Puerto Rico, San Juan, Puerto Rico
- Mar 2013 – Jun 2015 Director, Joint Staff – (PR) Joint Force Headquarters (JFHQ), San Juan, Puerto Rico
- Jan 2013 – Feb 13 Chief of Joint Staff, PRARNG Element JFHQ, San Juan, Puerto Rico
- Apr 2011 – Dec 12 Deputy Commander of CL, PRARNG Element JFHQ, San Juan, Puerto Rico
- Apr 2010 – Mar 11 RSS Chief, 101st Troop Command FWD, San Juan, Puerto Rico, Pristina Kosovo, Military Assistant to Chief of Staff
- Oct 2009 – Mar 10 Deputy Commander of CL, PRARNG Medical Command, Salinas, Puerto Rico
- Jan 2009 – Sep 09 Chief-Case Management, PRARNG Medical Command, Salinas, Puerto Rico
- Oct 2007 – Dec 08 Deputy Commander of CL, PRARNG Medical Command, Salinas, Puerto Rico
- Dec 2005 – Sep 07 Deputy Commander-Chief Nurse, PRARNG Medical Command, Salinas, Puerto Rico
- Feb 2003 – Nov 05 Executive Officer, PRARNG Medical Command, Salinas, Puerto Rico
- Dec 2001 – Jan 03 Head Nurse, PRARNG Medical Command, Salinas, Puerto Rico
- Aug 2001 – Nov 01 Clinical Nurse, PRARNG Element JFHQ, San Juan, Puerto Rico
- Oct 1998 – Jul 01 Clinical Nurse, HQ STARC, Medical Detachment, Salinas, Puerto Rico
- Jul 1996 – Sep 98 Clinical Nurse, 201st EVAC Hospital, Salinas, Puerto Rico
- Feb 1995 – Jun 96 Clinical Nurse, USAR MEDDAC Womack Army Medical Center, Fort Bragg, North Carolina
- Feb 1986 – Jan 95 Clinical Nurse, USAR MC HSP FLD (HUB), Puerto Nuevo, Puerto Rico

== Military awards and decorations ==
Over the year, Carcana has received multiple awards and decorations including:

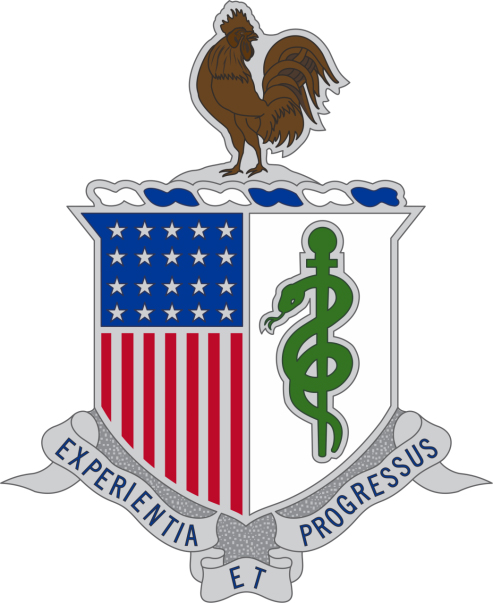
Regimental Insignia

Defense Meritorious Service Medal
Meritorious Service Medal
Army Commendation Medal
Army Achievement Medal
Army Reserve Components Achievement Medal with silver and bronze oak leaf clusters
National Defense Service Medal with one bronze service star
Kosovo Campaign Medal
Global War on Terrorism Service Medal
Armed Forces Reserve Medal with Silver Hourglass and "M" Device
Army Service Ribbon
Army Overseas Service Ribbon
Army Reserve Components Overseas Training Ribbon with award numeral 3
NATO Medal

In 2017 Marta Carcana was inducted to the Puerto Rico Veterans Hall of Fame.

== Effective dates of promotions ==
Insignia	Rank	Date
	Major general	February 15, 2016
	Brigadier general	October 29, 2015
	Colonel	August 2, 2006
	Lieutenant colonel	March 28, 2003
	Major	January 13, 1999
	Captain	June 23, 1993
	First lieutenant	February 11, 1989
	Second lieutenant	January 31, 1986

== See also ==
- List of Puerto Ricans
- List of Puerto Rican military personnel
- Puerto Rico Adjutant General
- History of women in Puerto Rico

Military offices
Preceded by Major General Juan José Medina Lamela	Adjutant General of the Puerto Rico National Guard; Under Governor Alejandro Garcia Padilla; 2015-2017	Succeeded by Brigadier General Isabelo Rivera
