= José J. Reyes =

Puerto Rican military officer

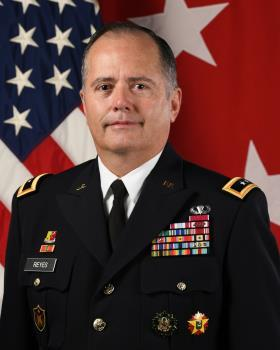
- Born: 1963 (age 62–63); Guaynabo, Puerto Rico
- Military career
- Allegiance: United States
- Branch: Army National Guard
- Service years: 1984–2023
- Rank: Major general
- Commands: 1st Battalion, 162nd Field Artillery; Adjutant General of the Puerto Rico National Guard
- Conflicts: Iraq War

José J. Reyes (born 1963) is the 22nd Puerto Rico Adjutant General, and the commanding officer of the Puerto Rico National Guard.

== Early life and education ==
Reyes was born in Guaynabo, Puerto Rico and raised in Carolina, Puerto Rico. As a youth he actively participated in the Boy Scouts of America as a member of Troop 572, in his hometown of Carolina. He served as Staff in Guajataka Scout Reservation and was awarded the Vigil Honor of the Order of the Arrow as Secretary of Yokahu Lodge. Has a BBA in Accounting from the University of Puerto Rico and a MSS in Strategic Studies from the United States Army War College. Graduated from the United States Army Command and General Staff College.

== Career ==
Reyes began his military career in 1984 as an active duty enlisted soldier in the United States Army. Commissioned as a 2LT in the active component on the United States Army in 1989. He took the Field Artillery Officer Basic Course at Fort Sill, Oklahoma and later served as Platoon Fire Direction Officer, Battery C, 4th Battalion, 1st Field Artillery, 5th Infantry Division at Fort Polk, Louisiana. Reyes began his career in the Puerto Rico National Guard in April 1994. He was appointed Adjutant General for the Puerto Rico National Guard on January 17, 2019, by Puerto Rico Governor Ricardo Rosselló.

Reyes was promoted to major general by Governor Rosselló on June 26, 2019. In June 2020, he was nominated for federal recognition of this promotion by President Donald Trump.

- Dec 16 Present Assistant Adjutant General, Puerto Rico Joint Force Headquarters, San Juan, Puerto Rico
- Oct 14 Dec 16 Commander, 201st Regiment (MF) Regional Training Institute, Puerto Rico Army National Guard, Juana Diaz, Puerto Rico
- Oct 13 Oct 14 Deputy Director of Intelligence J-2, Joint Forces Headquarters, Puerto Rico Army National Guard, San Juan, Puerto Rico
- Dec 11 Sep 13 Deputy Chief of Staff Operations G-3, Joint Forces Headquarters, Puerto Rico Army National Guard, San Juan, Puerto Rico
- Apr 11 Nov 11 Operations Action Officer, Office of the Deputy Chief of Staff G-3/5/7, Headquarters Department of the Army, Washington, DC
- Oct 10 Apr 11 HQDA G-3/5/7 Liaison/Staff Officer, USF-Iraq
- Oct 05 Sep 10 Operations Action Officer, Office of the Deputy Chief of Staff G-3/5/7, Headquarters Department of the Army, Washington, District of Columbia
- May 5 Oct 05 Operations Officer, HQ STARC, Puerto Rico Army National Guard, San Juan, Puerto Rico
- Jan 3 May 05 Operations Action Officer, Office of the Deputy Chief of Staff G-3/5/7, Headquarters Department of the Army, Washington, District of Columbia
- Apr 02 Jan 03 Brigade Fire Support Officer, 2nd Battalion, 162nd Field Artillery, Puerto Rico Army National Guard, San Juan, Puerto Rico
- Oct 00 Mar 02 Environmental Officer, HQ STARC, Puerto Rico Army National Guard, San Juan, Puerto Rico
- Jun 99 Sep 00 Battalion Motor Officer, HQs 1st Battalion, 162nd Field Artillery, Puerto Rico Army National Guard, San Juan, Puerto Rico
- Aug 97 May 99 Battalion Fire Direction Officer, HQs 1st Battalion, 162nd Field Artillery, Puerto Rico Army National Guard, San Juan, Puerto Rico
- Nov 94 Aug 97 Commander, C Battery, 1st Battalion, 162nd Field Artillery, Puerto Rico Army National Guard, San Juan, Puerto Rico
- Apr 94 Oct 94 Battalion Recon Survey Officer, HQs 1st Battalion, 162nd Field Artillery, Puerto Rico Army National Guard, San Juan, Puerto Rico
- Sep 91 Mar 94 Individual Ready Reserve (Control Group)
- Mar 91 Aug 91 Fire Support Team Chief, HQs 4th Battalion, 1st Field Artillery, 5th Infantry Division, Fort Polk, Louisiana
- Dec 89 Mar 91 Platoon Fire Direction Officer, Battery C, 4th Battalion, 1st Field Artillery, 5th Infantry Division, Fort Polk, Louisiana
- Jun 89 Dec 91 Student, Field Artillery Officer Basic Course, Fort Sill, Oklahoma

== Awards and decorations ==
Legion of Merit (with 1 bronze oak leaf cluster)
Defense Meritorious Service Medal
Meritorious Service Medal (with 4 bronze oak leaf clusters)
Army Commendation Medal
Army Achievement Medal
Army Good Conduct Medal
Army Reserve Component Achievement Medal (with 1 Silver Oak Leaf Cluster)
National Defense Service Medal (with 1 bronze service star)
Iraq Campaign Medal (with 1 bronze service star)
Global War on Terrorism Service Medal
Humanitarian Service Medal (with 1 bronze service star)
Armed Forces Reserve Medal with gold Hourglass device, "M" device and bronze award numeral 3
NCO Professional Development Ribbon
Army Service Ribbon
Army Overseas Service Ribbon
Army Superior Unit Award

=== Badges ===
- Parachutist badge
- Army Staff Identification Badge
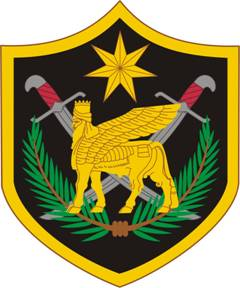
- MNF-I Combat Service Identification Badge

== Effective dates of promotions ==
Insignia	Rank	Date
	Major general	June 26, 2019
	Brigadier general	December 12, 2016
	Colonel	March 1, 2012
	Lieutenant colonel	December 7, 2006
	Major	January 25, 2001
	Captain	July 29, 1995
	First lieutenant	July 30, 1991
	Second lieutenant	June 12, 1989

== See also ==
- List of Puerto Rican military personnel
- Puerto Rico Adjutant General

Military offices
Preceded by Major General Isabelo Rivera	Adjutant General of the Puerto Rico National Guard; Under Governor Ricardo Rosselló-Wanda Vázquez Garced-Pedro Pierluisi; 2019–2023	Succeeded by Miguel A. Méndez
