= David Carrión Baralt =

Puerto Rican military officer

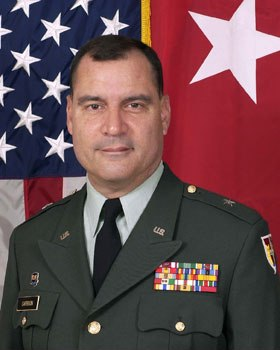
- Born: September 17, 1957 (age 69); Rio Piedras, Puerto Rico
- Military career
- Allegiance: United States of America
- Branch: Army National Guard
- Service years: 1979-2011
- Rank: Brigadier general
- Commands: Adjutant General of the Puerto Rico National Guard
- Awards: Meritorious Service Medal (2)

Brigadier General David A. Carrión Baralt is a former Adjutant General of the Puerto Rico National Guard during the administration of Puerto Rico Governor Aníbal Acevedo Vilá from 2004 to 2008.

== Early years ==
David Carrión was born on September 17, 1957, in Rio Piedras, Puerto Rico. Son of David Carrión Fuentes and Maria Mercedes Soltero. After High School went to study economics at the University of Puerto Rico at Mayagüez and law at the Interamerican University of Puerto Rico School of Law.

== Military and juridical career ==
Carrión Baralt, who since 2004 so far has played as officer of property and finances of the United States for Puerto Rico in the National Guard, earned his degree of Juris Doctor from the Faculty of law of the Interamerican University. Similarly, he holds a Masters in strategic planning from the United States Army War College at Carlisle Barracks in Carlisle, Pennsylvania, and holds a Bachelor of Arts with a concentration in economics of the University of Puerto Rico at Mayagüez. Completed the Staff Judge Advocate Course at The Judge Advocate General's Legal Center and School in Charlottesville, Virginia. He is admitted to legal practice in the Supreme Court of Puerto Rico, in the Court's circuit of appeals from the United States, for the first circuit and the District Court of the United States for the District of Puerto Rico. He also served as a legal military adviser during the weekends in the NG, from 1999 to 2004, where he provided legal assistance in military affairs and oversaw the performance of all consultants of the GN judges. Specifically, from 1987 to 1999 he worked as military legal adviser in time complete, position which was dedicated to reviewing administrative investigations, representing the National Guard to federal agencies, administrative and courts before the boards of the Government of Puerto Rico. At the same time, was the link between the NG and the Department of Justice of the United States. In its practice of lawyer, he was in areas of civil law, tax law and notarial law. As part of its contribution to the public service, Carrión Baralt also worked as a lawyer in the Department of Justice from 1985 to 1986, in the litigation Division. Their goals include improving the effectiveness and efficiency of the National Guard, including better use of its facilities such as the armories of the island and exploitation of the resources of the trust for the Puerto Rico National Guard.

- June 1979 - May 1980, Personnel Administrative Officer, Headquarters & Headquarters Detachment, Puerto Rio National Guard, Puerto Rico
- May 1980 - July 1980, Student, Adjutant General Officer Basic, United States of America Institute of Administration, Fort Benjamin Harrison, Indiana
- July 1980 - March 1983, Personnel Administrative Officer, Headquarters & Headquarters Detachment, Puerto Rico Army National Guard, San Juan, Puerto Rico
- April 1983 - September 1984, Executive Officer, Headquarters, State Area Command, Puerto Rico Army National Guard, San Juan, Puerto Rico
- September 1984 - March 1985, Student, Adjutant General Advance Officer Basic, United States of America Institute of Administration, Fort Benjamin Harrison, Indiana.
- March 1985 - January 1986, Executive Officer, Headquarters, State Area Command, Puerto Rico Army National Guard, San Juan, Puerto Rico
- February 1986 - April 1986, Detachment Commander, Headquarters, State Area Command, Puerto Rico Army National Guard, San Juan, Puerto Rico
- May 1986 - June 1986, Executive Officer, Headquarters, State Area Command, Puerto Rico Army National Guard, San Juan, Puerto Rico
- July 1986 - September 1987, Aide-de-Camp, Headquarters, State Area Command, Puerto Rico Army National Guard, San Juan, Puerto Rico
- September 1987 - November 1987, Recruiting & Induction Officer, Headquarters, State Area Command, Puerto Rico Army National Guard, San Juan, Puerto Rico
- December 1987 - January 1989, Retention Officer, Headquarters, State Area Command, Puerto Rico Army National Guard, San Juan, Puerto Rico
- January 1989 -September 1990, Judge Advocate General, Headquarters, State Area Command, Puerto Rico Army National Guard, San Juan, Puerto Rico
- September 1990 - October 1999, Judge Advocate General, Headquarters, State Area Command, Puerto Rico Army National Guard, San Juan, Puerto Rico
- November 1999 - November 2004, Staff Judge Advocate, Headquarters, State Area Command, Puerto Rico Army National Guard, San Juan, Puerto Rico
- November 2004 - December 2006, United States Property & Fiscal Officer, Puerto Rico Army National Guard, Joint Element Joint Forces -Headquarters, San Juan, Puerto Rico
- January 2007 - January 2011, The Adjutant General, Puerto Rico National Guard, Joint Element Joint Forces - Headquarters, San Juan, Puerto Rico

== Military awards and decorations ==
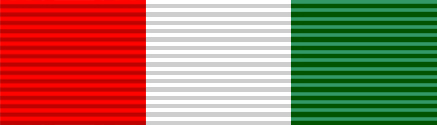
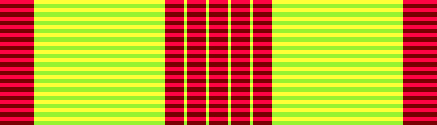
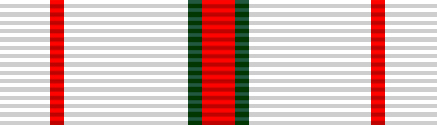
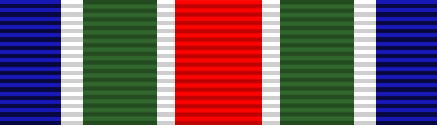
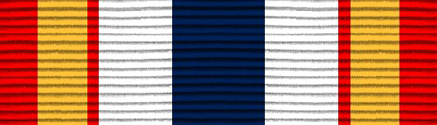
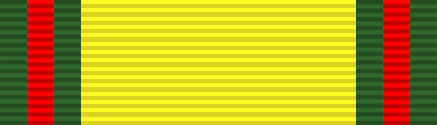
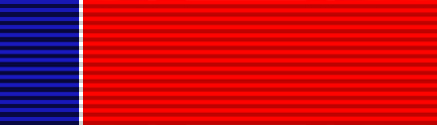
Meritorious Service Medal with two bronce oak leaf clusters
Army Commendation Medal
Army Reserve Components Achievement Medal with two bronze oak leaf clusters
National Defense Service Medal with one bronze service star
Global War on Terrorism Service Medal
Humanitarian Service Medal with one bronze service star
Armed Forces Reserve Medal with Gold hourglass device
Army Service Ribbon
Puerto Rico Service Medal with two service stars
Puerto Rico Commendation Medal
Puerto Rico Disaster Relief Ribbon
Puerto Rico Hurricane Georges Ribbon
Puerto Rico Active Duty for Training Ribbon
Puerto Rico English Language Proficiency Ribbon
Puerto Rico Community Service Ribbon

=== Badges ===
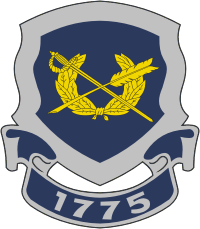
- Regimental Insignia

== Effective Dates of Promotions ==
Insignia	Rank	Date
	Brigadier General	2005
	Colonel	May 3, 2001
	Lieutenant Colonel	January 17, 1997
	Major	November 9, 1989
	Captain	June 25, 1984
	First Lieutenant	June 8, 1982
	Second Lieutenant	June 9, 1979

== See also ==
- List of Puerto Rican military personnel
- Puerto Rico Adjutant General

Military offices
Preceded by Major General Francisco A. Márquez	Adjutant General of the Puerto Rico National Guard; Under Governor Aníbal Acevedo Vilá; 2007–2011	Succeeded by Major General Antonio J. Vicens
