= Alberto A. Picó =

Puerto Rico Adjutant General

- Born: August 23, 1918; Coamo, Puerto Rico
- Died: September 4, 2003 (aged 85); Mayagüez, Puerto Rico
- Military career
- Branch: United States Army; Army National Guard
- Service years: 1940–1972
- Rank: Major general
- Unit: 13th Armored Division
- Commands: 296th Infantry Regiment; 65th Infantry Regiment; Adjutant General of the Puerto Rico National Guard
- Conflicts: World War II
- Awards: Bronze Star Medal

Alberto A. Picó (born August 23, 1918, in Coamo, Puerto Rico – September 4, 2003, in Mayagüez, Puerto Rico) was a military officer who became the 4th Puerto Rico Adjutant General.

== Early years ==
After completing elementary and high school in his hometown, in 1938 he went to the University of Puerto Rico where he received his B.A. in arts and a commission of Second Lieutenant on May 29, 1940, thru the Army ROTC program.

== Military and professional career ==
During World War II he served in Puerto Rico, the United States and Europe from 1940 to 1946. Until 1944 he served as an intelligence officer and later moved to the front lines with the 13th Armored Division.

In 1947 went on to the Puerto Rico National Guard. Was called to serve active duty during the Korean War with the 296th Infantry Regiment. In 1951 went to the republic of Colombia to train Colombian troops to fight in the Korean War.

Was back in the Puerto Rico National Guard in 1953 as commander of the 3rd Battalion 296th Infantry Regiment. In 1960 became Commander of the First Battle Group of the 65th Infantry with the rank of Colonel. On January 10, 1968, appointed Adjutant General of the National Guard of Puerto Rico by governor Luis A. Ferré and on March 3, 1968, he was promoted to the rank of General Brigadier. On August 10, 1970, he received another promotion to Major General. Alberto A. Picó retired from the Puerto Rico National Guard in 1972.

Had a 28 year career with the United States Customs Service where he worked as auxiliary chief in Ponce, Puerto Rico.

== Military awards and decorations ==
Among Roig's decorations are the following:

Combat Infantryman Badge

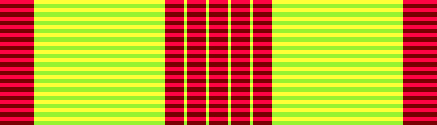
Bronze Star Medal
American Defense Service Medal with one bronze Service star
American Campaign Medal
European-African-Middle East Campaign Medal
World War II Victory Medal
Army of Occupation Medal
Army Commendation Medal
National Defense Service Medal
Armed Forces Reserve Medal with Gold hourglass device
United Nations Korea Medal
Puerto Rico Commendation Medal

== Death ==
Alberto A. Picó died on September 4, 2003, in Mayagüez, Puerto Rico at age 85.

Military offices
Preceded by Brigadier General Salvador T. Roig	Adjutant General of the Puerto Rico National Guard; Under Governor Luis A. Ferré; 1969–1972	Succeeded by Major General Carlos Fernando Chardón
