= Antonio J. Vicens =

Adjutant General of the Puerto Rico National Guard

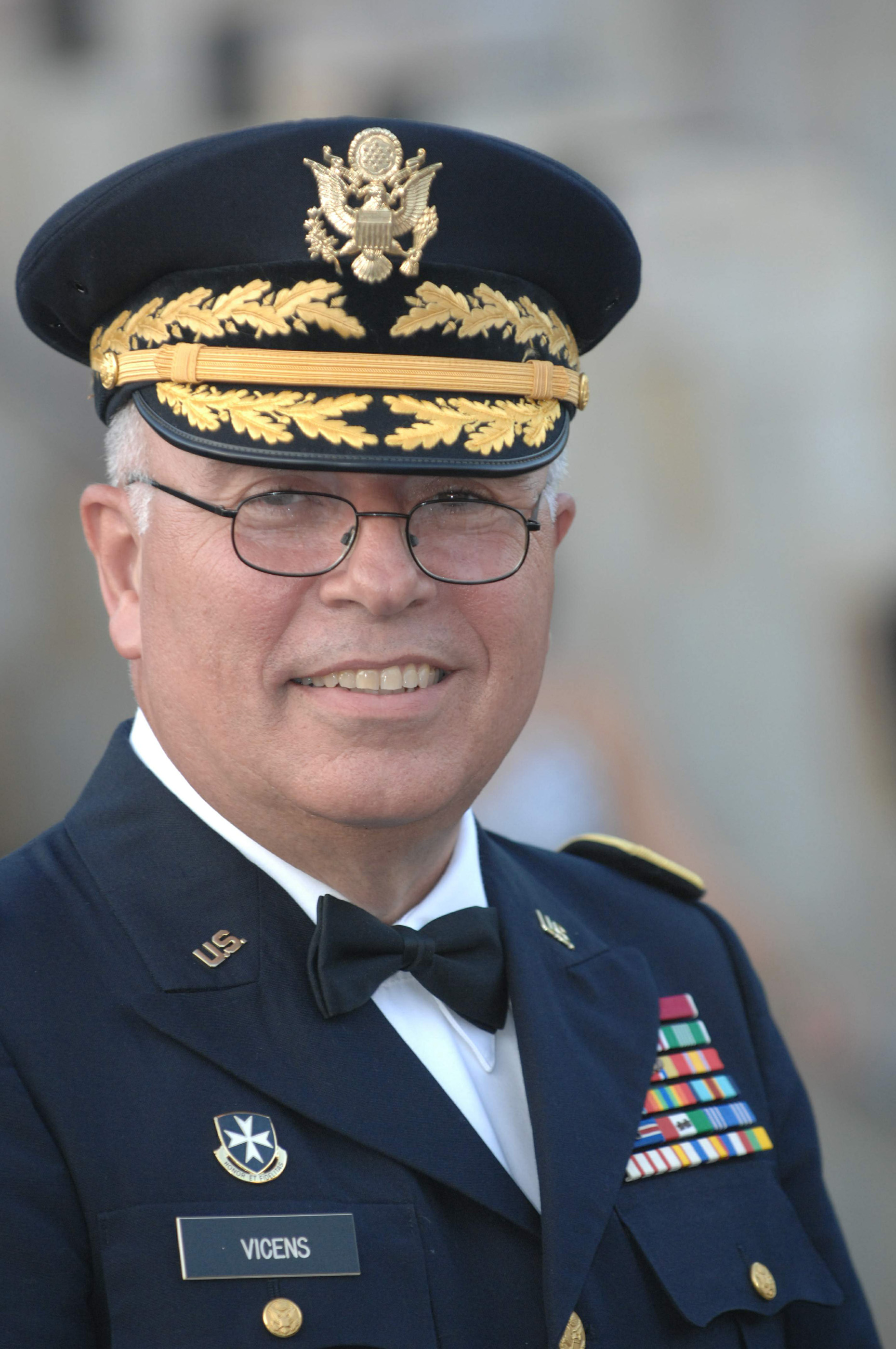
- Major General Antonio J. Vicens (Ret); 18th Adjutant General of the Puerto Rico National Guard
- Born: December 1947 (age 78); Santurce, Puerto Rico
- Military career
- Allegiance: United States of America
- Branch: Army National Guard
- Service years: 35+
- Rank: Major General
- Commands: Puerto Rico National Guard; 92nd Maneuver Enhancement Brigade; 65th Infantry Regiment (United States)
- Awards: Legion of Merit; Meritorious Service Medal; Army Commendation Medal

Antonio J. Vicens-Gonzalez was the 18th Adjutant General of the Puerto Rico National Guard from January 2, 2009, to December 2012. The Adjutant General is the Commander of the Puerto Rico National Guard. As the Adjutant General he was also the Senior Military Advisor to the Governor of Puerto Rico and oversees both State and Federal Missions of the PR National Guard. He provides effective leadership and management in the implementation of all programs and policies affecting more than 10,500 citizen-soldiers and airmen, and civilian employees of the three components of the PR National Guard: Army National Guard, Air National Guard and Puerto Rico State Guard. MG Vicens holds a B.B.A-Management Degree from the University of Puerto Rico.

== Military career ==
- Vicens was the Distinguished Military Graduate of the Officer Candidate School from the Puerto Rico National Guard class #9 of 1972 at the Joint Maneuver Training Center in Camp Santiago, Salinas Puerto Rico.
- His military school and courses included Joint Firepower control Course at Nellis Air Force Base, Jungle Warfare Training Course at Fort Sherman in Panama, Command and General Staff Course and Infantry Brigade and Battalion Commander's Course at Fort Benning, and Inter-American Defense College at Fort Lesley J. McNair.
- Vicens' first assignment was from June 1972 to February 1974 where he served as Platoon Leader in Troop E 192nd CAV, PRARNG, Salinas Puerto Rico
- From March 1974 to May 1974 he attended the Armor School at Fort Knox, Kentucky.
- From May 1974 to June 1979 he served as a Platoon Leader in Troop E 192d CAV, PRARNG, Salinas, Puerto Rico
- From July 1979 to December 1979 he served as the Executive Officer of Troop E 192d CAV PRARNG, Salinas, Puerto Rico
- From December 1979 to November 1980 he held the position of S-3 Air in the 165th Infantry Battalion, PRARNG, Cayey, Puerto Rico
- In November 1980 he attended the Joint Firepower School at Eglin Air Force Base, Florida. He then returned to his duties as S-3 Air in the 165th Infantry Battalion, PRARNG and remained there until June 1981, Cayey, Puerto Rico
- From June 1981 to June 1985, he Commanded the Combat Support Company of 1-65th Infantry Battalion, PRARNG, Cayey, Puerto Rico
- From June 1985 to November 1985, he served as the Motor Officer of 1-65th Infantry Battalion, PRARNG, Cayey, Puerto Rico
- From November 1985 to August 1986 he served as the S-2 of 1-65th Infantry Battalion, PRARNG, Cayey, Puerto Rico
- From August 1986 to November 1987 he served as the Assistant S-3 of 92nd Infantry Brigade (Separate), PRARNG, Juana Diaz, Puerto Rico
- From November 1987 to January 1989 he served as the S-2 of the 92nd Infantry Brigade (Separate), PRARNG, Juana Diaz, Puerto Rico
- From January 1989 to December 1989, he attended the Command and General Staff Course at Fort Benning, Georgia.
- From December 1989 to September 1990 he resumed his duties as the S-2 of the 92nd Infantry Brigade, (Separate), PRARNG, Juana Diaz, Puerto Rico
- From September 1990 to March 1994, he served as the Executive Officer, Headquarters and Headquarters Company, 1st Battalion, 295th Infantry Battalion, PRARNG, Caguas, Puerto Rico
- From March 1994 to November 1994, he commanded the 1st Battalion, 65th Infantry Brigade, PRARNG, Cayey, Puerto Rico
- In November 1994, he attended the Infantry School, Fort Benning, Georgia.
- From November 1994 to August 1997, he resumed his duties as commander of 1-65th Infantry Battalion, PRARNG, Juana Diaz, Puerto Rico
- From August 1997 to July 1998 he served as the S-3 of the 92nd Infantry Brigade (Separate), PRARNG, Juana Diaz, Puerto Rico
- From July 1998 to June 1999, he attended the Inter-American Defense College at Fort McNair, Washington, DC.
- From June 1999 to January 2000, he served as the Deputy Commander of the 92nd Infantry Brigade (Separate), PRARNG, San Juan, Puerto Rico
- From February 2000 to March 2004, he served as the Deputy Adjutant General (Army), Headquarters, State Area Command Detachment, San Juan, Puerto Rico
- From March 2004 to October 2005, served as the commander of the 92nd Infantry Brigade (Separate), San Juan, Puerto Rico
- From October 2005 to January 2009, he served in USAR Control Group (Retired).
- From January 2009 to January 2013 served as the Adjutant General of the Puerto Rico National Guard, San Juan, Puerto Rico

== Awards and decorations ==
Majors awards and decorations are:

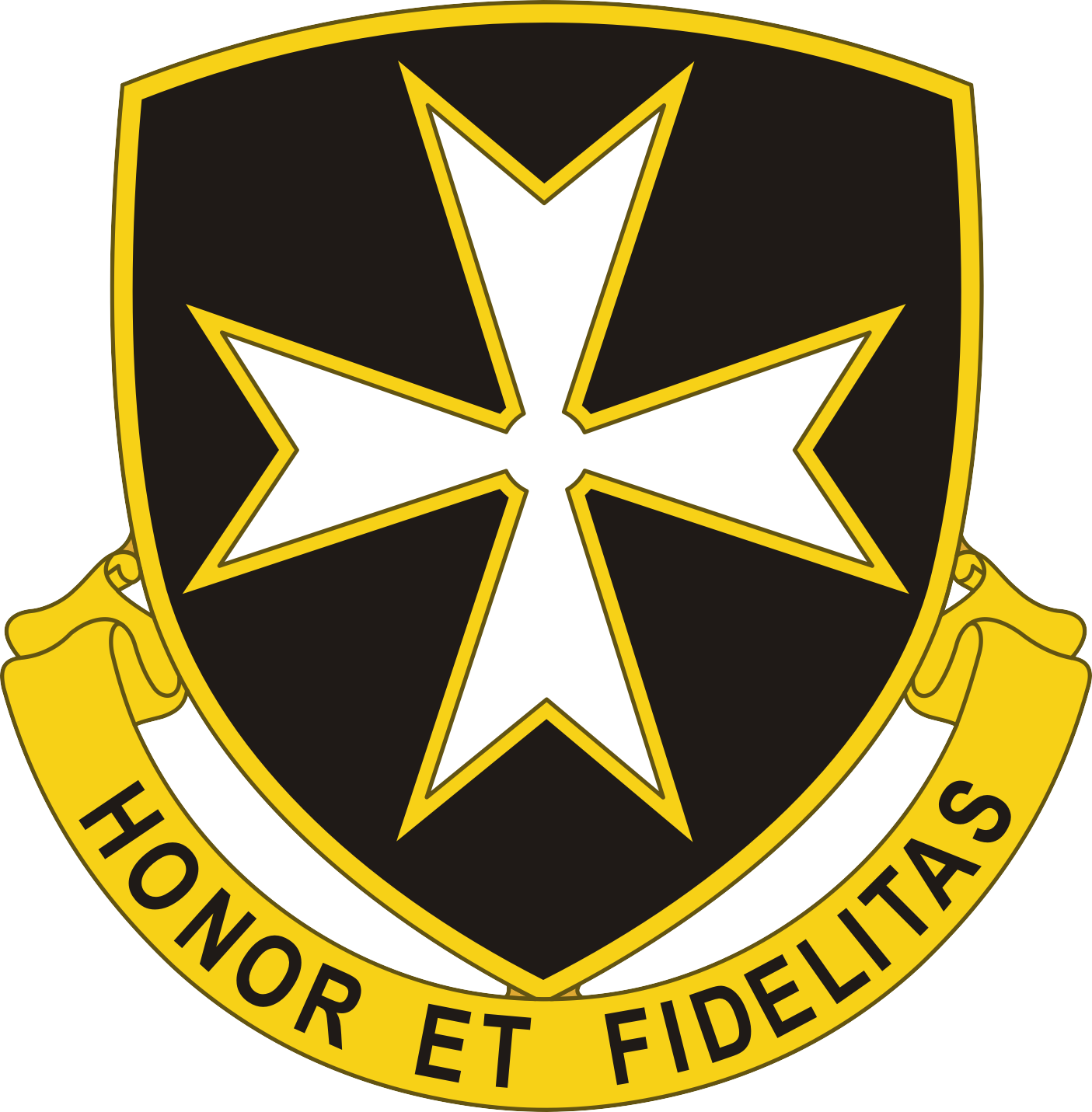
65th Infantry Regiment Distinctive Unit Insignia

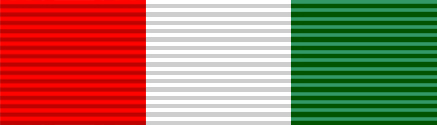
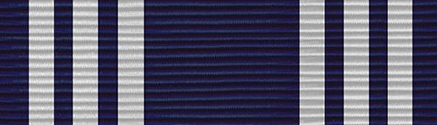
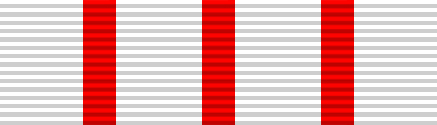
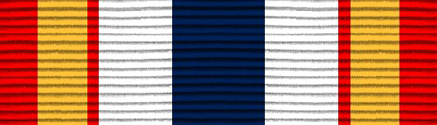
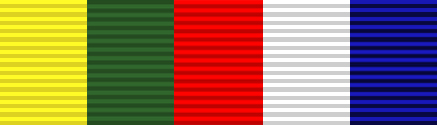
| Legion of Merit |
| Meritorious Service Medal |
| Army Commendation Medal |
| Army Achievement Medal |
| Army Reserve Components Achievement Medal with four bronze Oak leaf clusters |
| National Defense Service Medal |
| Armed Forces Reserve Medal with Gold hourglass device |
| Army Service Ribbon |
| Army Overseas Service Ribbon |
| Army Reserve Components Overseas Training Ribbon |
| Puerto Rico Service Medal with two Service stars |
| Puerto Rico Exemplary Conduct Ribbon |
| Puerto Rico Civil Disturbance Ribbon |
| Puerto Rico Active Duty for Training Ribbon |
| Puerto Rico VIII Pan-American Games Support Ribbon |

He has been inducted into the Officer Candidate School Hall of Fame of the Puerto Rico National Guard in Fort Allen, Puerto Rico and The Inter-American Defence College, Ft. McNair, Washington DC.

== Effective dates of promotions ==
| Insignia | Rank | Date |
|---|---|---|
| | Major General | June 11, 2011 |
| | Brigadier General | October 6, 2000 |
| | Colonel | February 19, 1999 |
| | Lieutenant Colonel | April 18, 1994 |
| | Major | November 4, 1986 |
| | Captain | September 12, 1980 |
| | First Lieutenant | June 17, 1975 |
| | Second Lieutenant | June 18, 1972. |

== See also ==
- List of Puerto Rican military personnel
- Puerto Rico Adjutant General

Military offices
| Preceded by Brigadier General David Carrión Baralt | Adjutant General of the Puerto Rico National Guard; Under Governor Luis Fortuño; 2009–2013 | Succeeded by Brigadier General Juan José Medina Lamela |
