= Adjutant General of Puerto Rico =

Commander of the Puerto Rico National Guard

Puerto Rico Adjutant General
- Seal of the National Guard Bureau
- Incumbent; Colonel Carlos J. Rivera Román since June 23, 2025
- Puerto Rico National Guard
- Reports to: Secretary of Public Safety
- Nominator: Governor of Puerto Rico with advice and consent from the Senate
- Appointer: Governor of Puerto Rico
- Formation: 1919; 107 years ago
- Deputy: Deputy Adjutant General
- Website: www.nationalguard.com

The Puerto Rico Adjutant General (Spanish: Ayudante General de Puerto Rico) is the commander of the Puerto Rico National Guard. As the adjutant general he is also the senior military advisor to the Governor of Puerto Rico and oversees both State and Federal Missions of the Puerto Rico National Guard. He provides leadership and management in the implementation of all programs and policies affecting more than 10,500 citizen-soldiers and airmen, and civilian employees of the three components of the PR National Guard: Puerto Rico Army National Guard, Puerto Rico Air National Guard and Puerto Rico State Guard. It is the responsibility of the Adjutant General of the Commonwealth to share his reports with the Secretary of the Army or the Secretary of the Air Force.

The Adjutant General has a deputy adjutant general, who is the principal advisor assisting in the discharge of responsibilities in the areas of logistics, fiscal compliance, and personnel administration.

== History ==
In 1906, a group of Puerto Ricans met with the United States-appointed Governor of Puerto Rico Beekman Winthrop, and suggested the organization of a Puerto Rican National Guard. The petition failed because the U.S. Constitution prohibits the formation of any armed force within the United States and its territories without the authorization of Congress.

Puerto Ricans served in the "Porto Rico Regiment" (later renamed 65th Infantry Regiment) as part of the regular United States Army during World War I, many of which received their military training at Camp Las Casas in Santurce a sector of San Juan, Puerto Rico. Luis R. Esteves, the first Puerto Rican to graduate from the United States Military Academy, helped organize the 23rd Battalion, which would be composed of Puerto Ricans and be stationed in Panama during World War I.

It became apparent to Esteves that Puerto Rico needed a National Guard. After the war, esteves and various officers took up the matter with then U.S.-appointed governor of Puerto Rico Arthur Yager. Esteves' efforts were successful and with the approval of the Governor and the Insular Legislature, the Puerto Rican National Guard was organized in 1919.

In 1919, Governor Yager named Major John A. Wilson (U.S. Army) the first adjutant of Puerto Rico. The Adjutant is a military rank or appointment. The position did not require that Wilson hold the rank of general. The appointment of the Adjutant of Puerto Rico was the responsibility of the Governor. As such, he assisted the Governor in military matters. Major Wilson served as Adjutant of Puerto Rico until he died in 1938.

Major General Luis Raul Esteves was the first commanding officer of the Puerto Rico National Guard, and in 1938, became the first "Adjutant General", a position he held until his retirement on June 30, 1957. As adjutant general, he was the Governor's senior military adviser and oversaw both state and federal missions of the Puerto Rico National Guard.

=== Adjutant General appointments: 2015 - present ===
In July 2015, Puerto Rico Governor Alejandro Garcia Padilla named Colonel Martha Carcana Adjutant General of the Puerto Rican National Guard. She is the first Puerto Rican woman to be named as such.

In January 2017, Brigadier General Isabelo Rivera was named adjutant general by Governor Ricardo Rosselló.

== Commands ==
Among the units under the command of the Adjutant Generals command are the following:

- Puerto Rico National Guard
  - Puerto Rico Army National Guard
    - 92nd Military Police Brigade
    - 101st Troop Command
    - 191st Regional Support Group
  - Puerto Rico Air National Guard
    - 156th Airlift Wing
  - Puerto Rico State Guard

== Former generals ==
The following are the former and current Adjutant Generals of Puerto Rico:

- 1919–1938: John A. Wilson.
- 1938–1957: Luis R. Esteves.
- 1957–1958: Eduardo Andino
- 1958–1965: Juan César Cordero Dávila
- 1965–1968: Salvador T. Roig (Note: The rank of major general held by Roig and Chardón were only recognized as such by the Puerto Rico National Guard but not by the regular United States Army.)
- 1969–1972: Alberto A. Picó
- 1973–1975: Carlos Fernando Chardón
- 1975–1977: Salvador M. Padilla Escabi
- 1977–1983: Orlando Llenza
- 1983–1985: Luis González Vales
- 1985–1990: Alfredo J. Mora
- 1990–1993: William Miranda Marin
- 1993–2001: Emilio Díaz Colón
- 2001–2007: Francisco A. Márquez
- 2007–2009: David Carrión Baralt
- 2009–2013: Antonio J. Vicens.
- 2013–2014: Juan José Medina
- 2015–2017: Marta Carcana (note: Carcana held the position since 2014 unofficially, however in 2015 she was officially named Adjutant General)
- 2017–2019: Isabelo Rivera
- 2019–2023: José J. Reyes
- 2023–2025: Miguel A. Méndez
- 2025–present: Carlos J. Rivera Román

== Gallery ==
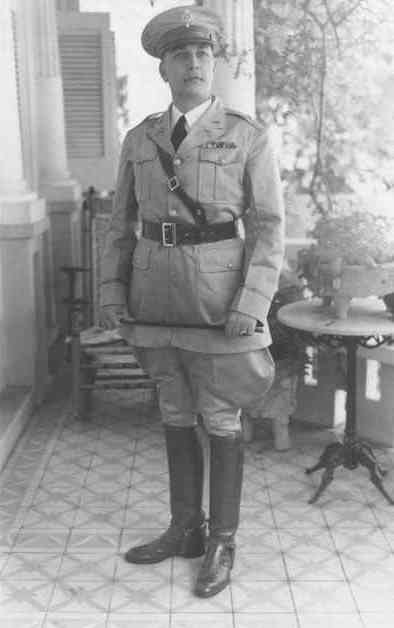
Major General Luis R. Esteves

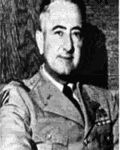
Major General Juan César Cordero Davila

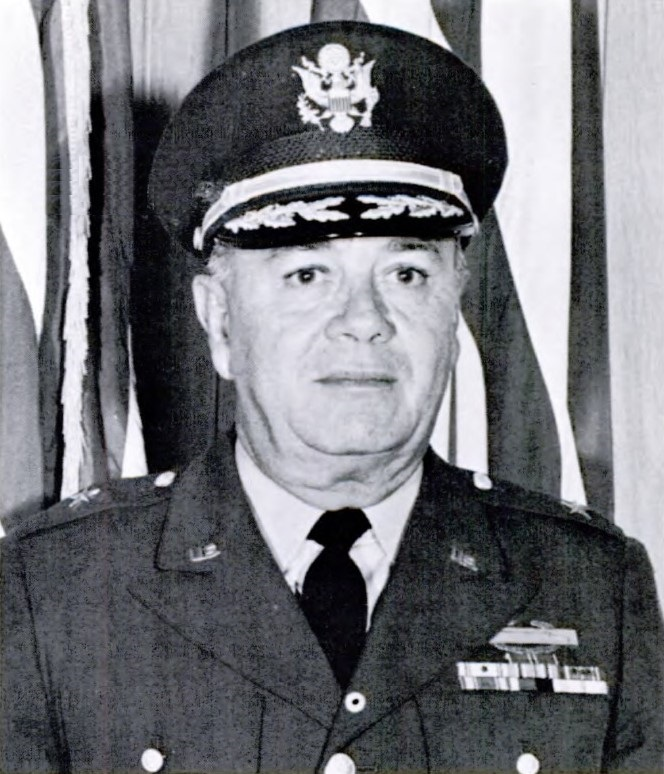
Brigadier General Salvador T. Roig

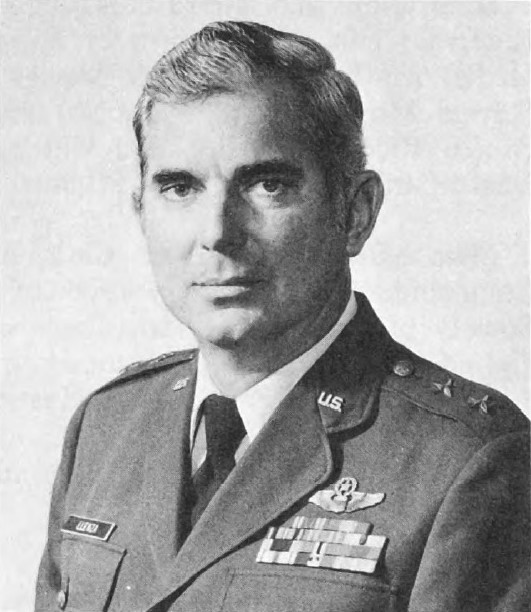
Major General Orlando Llenza

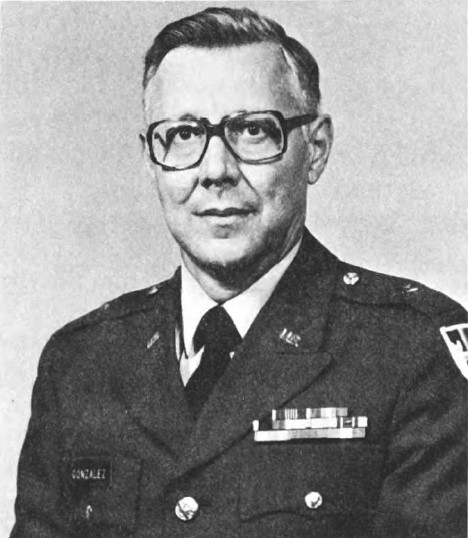
Mayor General Luis González Vales

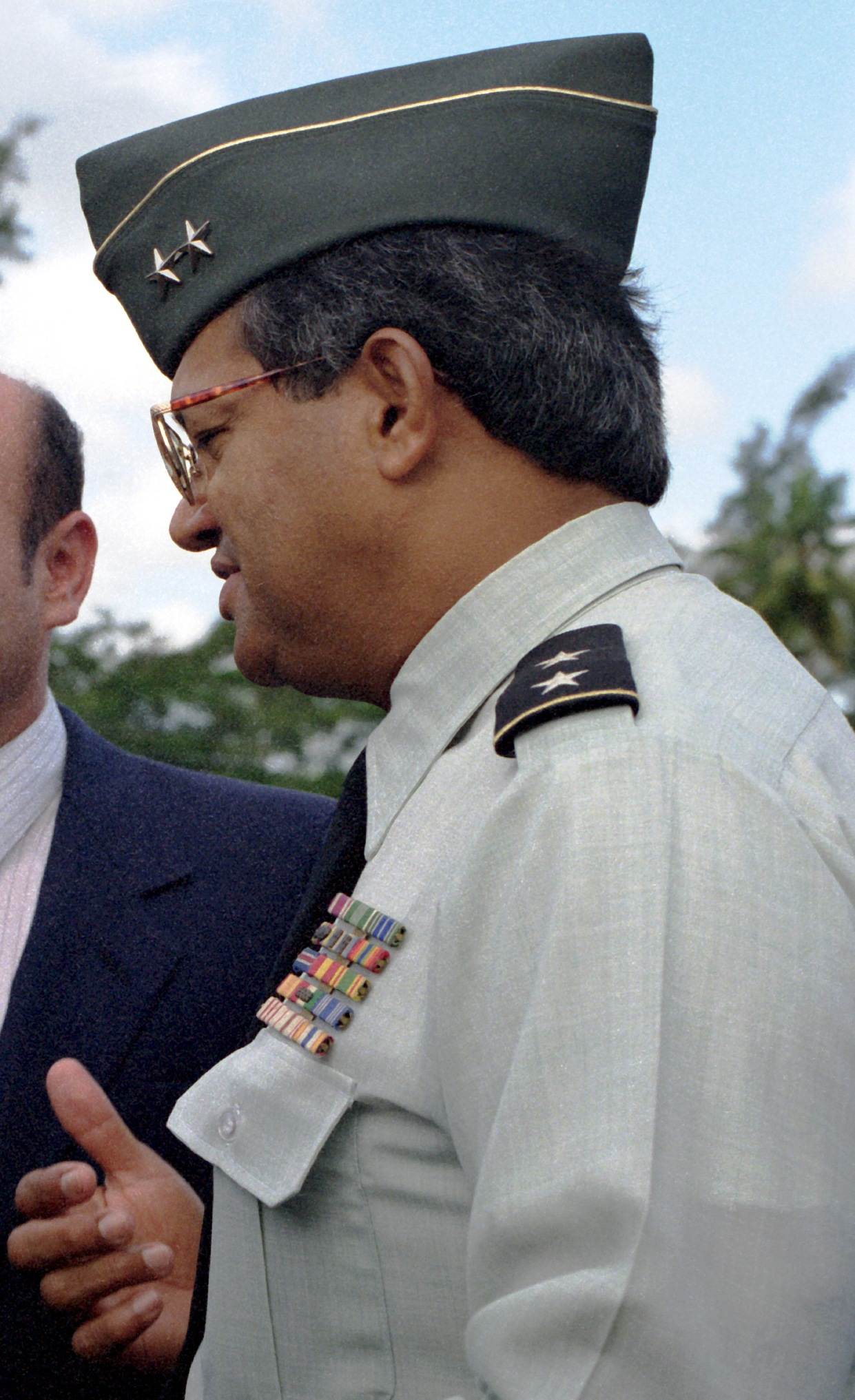
Major General William Miranda Marín

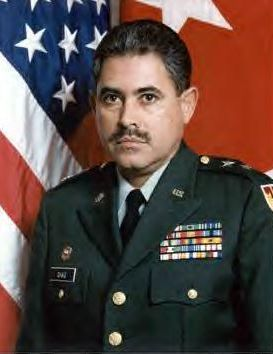
Major General Emilio Díaz Colón

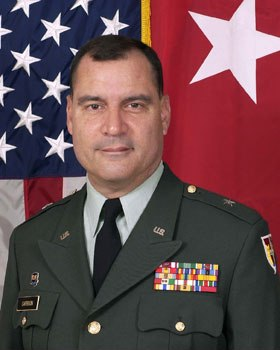
Brigadier General David Carrión Baralt

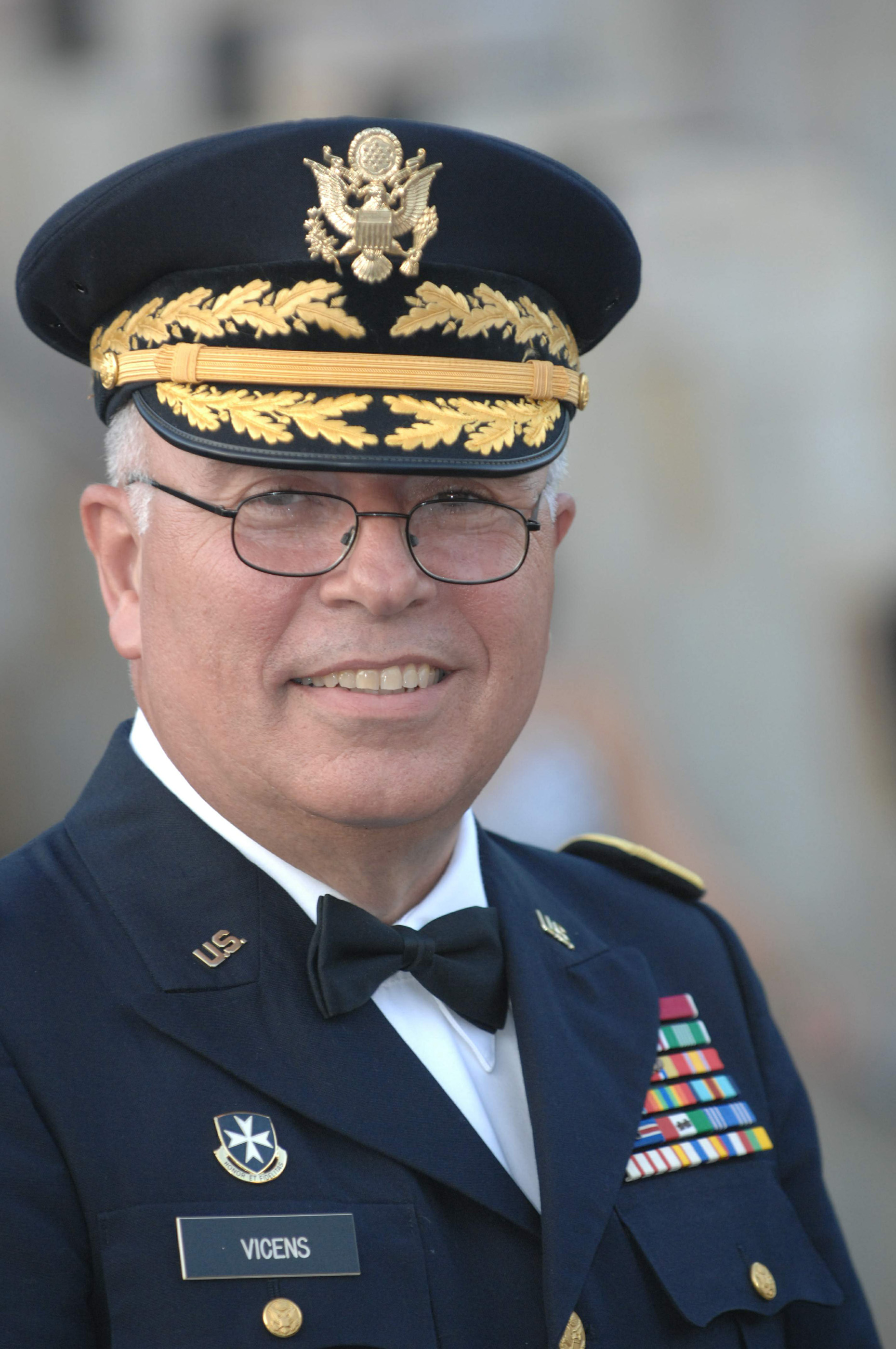
Major General Antonio J. Vicens

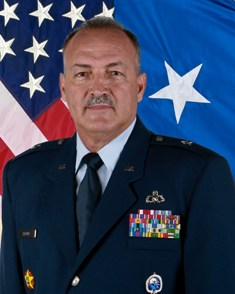
Brigadier General Juan J. Medina

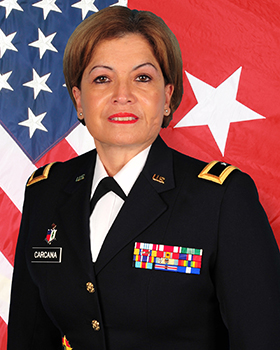
Major General Marta Carcana

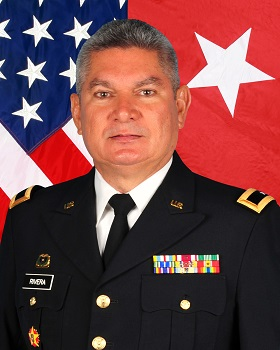
Brigadier General Isabelo Rivera Negrón

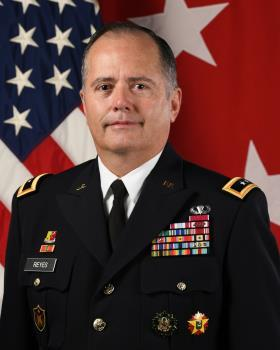
Major General José J. Reyes

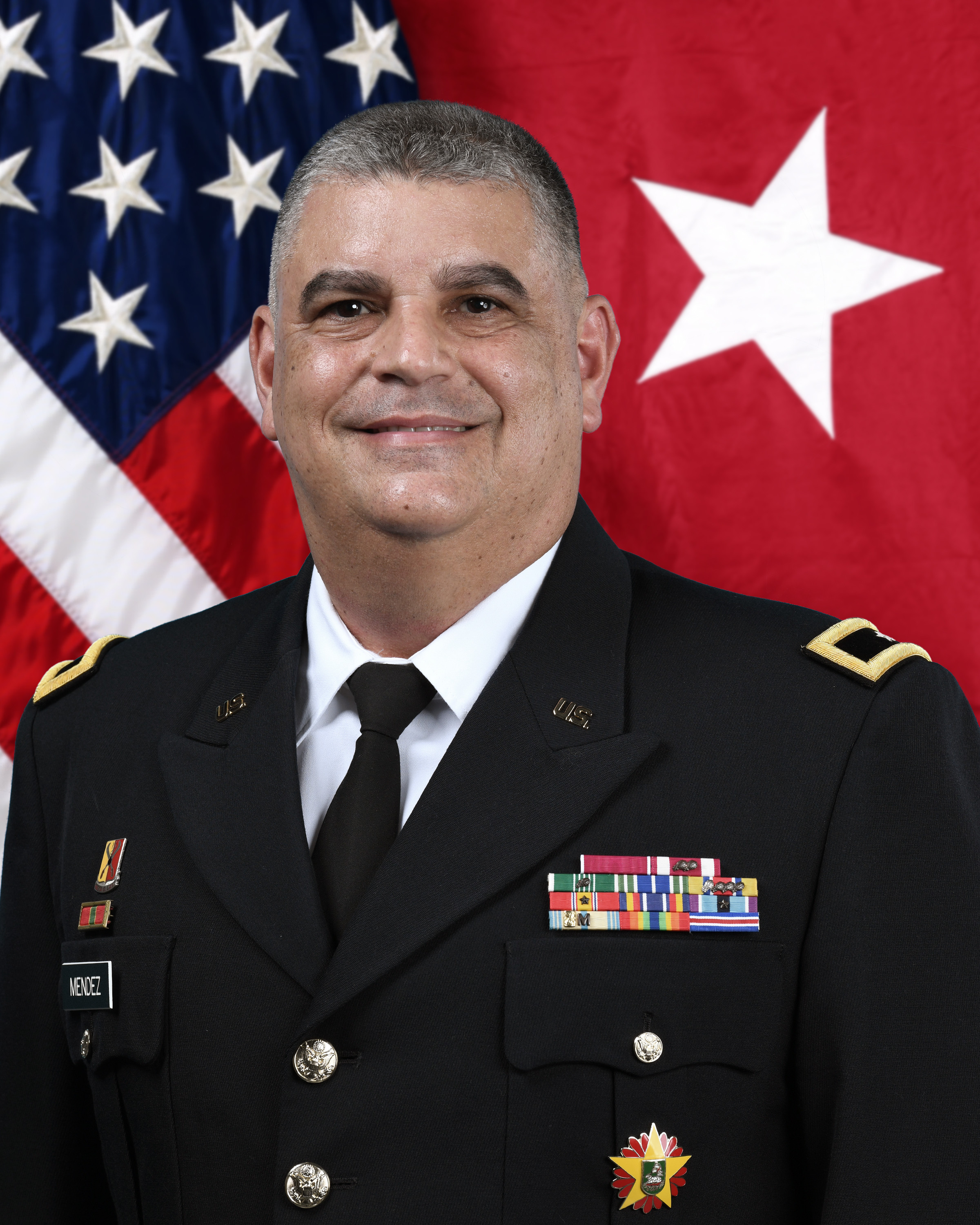
Major General Miguel A. Mendez

== See also ==
- Military history of Puerto Rico
- List of Puerto Rican military personnel
- 65th Infantry
- Mihiel Gilormini
- Alberto A. Nido
- José Antonio Muñiz
- José M. Portela
