= Puerto Rico National Guard =

U.S. National Guard of the Commonwealth of Puerto Rico

- Guardia Nacional de Puerto Rico
- Distinctive unit insignia of the Puerto Rico National Guard
- Founded: June 3, 1916; 110 years ago
- Country: United States
- Allegiance: Puerto Rico
- Branch: United States Army; United States Air Force
- Type: National Guard
- Role: Provide soldiers and airmen to the U.S. Army and U.S. Air Force in national emergencies or when requested by the president of the United States; military operations at the state level or any other lawful service as requested by the governor of Puerto Rico
- Size: 8,500 soldiers and airmen
- Part of: National Guard Bureau; United States Department of the Air Force; United States Department of the Army
- Garrison/HQ: San Juan, PR
- Motto: Siempre Presente
- Mascot: lamb
- Engagements: Korean War; Puerto Rican Nationalist Party revolts of the 1950s War in Afghanistan; Iraq War

Commanders
- Commander-in-chief: Governor of Puerto Rico Jenniffer González-Colón
- Adjutant General of Puerto Rico: MG Miguel A. Mendez-Fontanez
- State Command Sergeant Major: CSM Reinaldo Soto
- Notable commanders: Luis R. Esteves; William Miranda Marín

The Puerto Rico National Guard (PRNG; Spanish: Guardia Nacional de Puerto Rico) is the national guard of the U.S. Commonwealth of Puerto Rico. The Constitution of the United States specifically charges the National Guard with dual federal and state missions, which includes to provide soldiers and airmen to the United States Army and U.S. Air Force in national emergencies or when requested by the president of the United States, and to perform military operations at the state level or any other lawful service as requested by the governor of Puerto Rico. The PRNG responds to the governor of Puerto Rico, who serves as its commander in chief and imparts orders with the Puerto Rico adjutant general acting as conduit, and its local mission is to respond as requested in military or civilian tasks. Abroad, its main function is to train a reserve capable of providing additional personnel in a war scenario.

== Background ==
The PRNG traces its roots back to the first Puerto Rican militias founded by Juan Ponce de León during the 16th century and prides itself in the battles that its predecessor won against the Taíno, enemy navies, pirates, privateers and buccaneers, such as Francis Drake, Cumberland and Balduino Henrico, centuries before from strongholds such as Castillo San Felipe del Morro. These forces which preceded by operated similarly to the Minutemen, were involved in a number of military and piratical incursions during the Spanish colonial period. Due to this, the PRNG claims to be the only member of the National Guard of the United States to be a product of two distinct lineages.

The entity claims a unique tradition that unlike the rest of the state national guards, also includes the early American period that preceded the creation of the Thirteen Colonies. This claim is reflected in its first coat of arms which depicts the defeat of the British in the second Battle of San Juan and the patch worn by the 295th Regiment, designed by John Roqueña in 1953, which features a man wearing a morion. The first coat of arms of the PRNG featured a lion guarding a tower on top of an isle located in the middle of a blue field representing the ocean, the beast representing the militia guarding San Juan, three sailboats that represent the defeated British float in 1798, and a sheep next to a red book representing Puerto Rico as seen in the coat of arms. Since its early days, the units stationed in Puerto Rico used a yellow and red patch that features a guerite, similar to those at El Morro.

After the Spanish–American War in 1898, Spain ceded Puerto Rico to the United States. US military authorities discussed Puerto Rico's military value. It offered tremendous commercial value in expanding commerce among the US, Central and South America. Because of the political changes in the beginning of the 20th century, the strategic military importance of Puerto Rico grew. In 1906, a group of Puerto Ricans met with Governor Winthrop, and the commissioner of interior, Lawrence H. Graham, to organize a National Guard of Puerto Rico. The public supported this effort and some companies were organized, in different towns around the island: Yauco under the command of Captain Santiago Vivaldi; Juana Díaz, commanded by Captain Diaz-Brik; Peñuelas by Captain Gabino Balasquide; and two in Ponce by Pedro Juan Armstrong, Mario Belaval, J. Oppenheimer, F. del Valle and Doctor Laguna. In San Juan three companies were organized under Federico Vall-Spinosa, Justo Barros, J. del Barril, R. Swigett, J. Doere, Lugo Vinas and F. Fano. As the companies were being formed, all of the officers and soldiers had to purchase their own uniforms and supplies, since there was no government funding for the enterprise. This organization failed due to existing US federal law, which prohibited the formation of any armed force within the United States and its territories without authorization from Congress.

During World War I, Puerto Ricans served in the 373rd, 374th, and 375th Infantry Regiments of the National Army and the Puerto Rican Regiment of the Regular Army. Approximately 20,000 troops were trained at Camp Las Casas. The young Puerto Rican officer, Luis Raúl Estevez, thought a Puerto Rican National Guard was needed. As the first Puerto Rican to graduate from the US Military Academy at West Point, he had learned about military units in other states. He discussed the issue with the governor of Puerto Rico, Arthur Yager, soon after the conclusion of World War I. The governor, Legislature of Puerto Rico, and US Congress approved the plan, and the National Guard was organized in 1919. In 1938, Luis R. Esteves was promoted to major general and appointed as Adjutant General of the Puerto Rican National Guard.

The first regiment of the Puerto Rico National Guard, "First Infantry Regiment", was organized on June 2, 1920 and reorganized on December 26, 1922, as the 295th Infantry Regiment. On March 1, 1936, the 296th Infantry Regiment was organized. Before, the 296th existed as a battalion of the 295th Infantry Regiment. On October 30, 1950, the Puerto Rican Nationalist Party organized a series of uprisings in numerous cities in Puerto Rico against United States rule and the Puerto Rican commonwealth government in what is known as the Puerto Rican Nationalist Party Revolts of the 1950s. The Puerto Rico National Guard was mobilized under the command of Puerto Rico adjutant general Luis R. Esteves by orders of Governor Luis Muñoz Marín and sent to confront the Nationalists in various towns such as Jayuya, Utuado and San Juan.

Due to the lack of belligerent invaders, the PRNG has participated in a number of functions such as coordination during natural disasters (mainly tropical storms, hurricanes, floods and droughts) repairing roads, bridges, telecommunication arrays and aqueducts. The PRNG also hosts other disciplines, including a band and a religious services branch that includes personal of different credos. Through these, the organization also related with other government agencies and entities, occasionally organizing parades or friendly competitions or entertainment through its artistic unit, Banda 248. Otherwise, the organization makes donations to other initiatives, mainly the Red Cross and similar entities.

== Structure ==
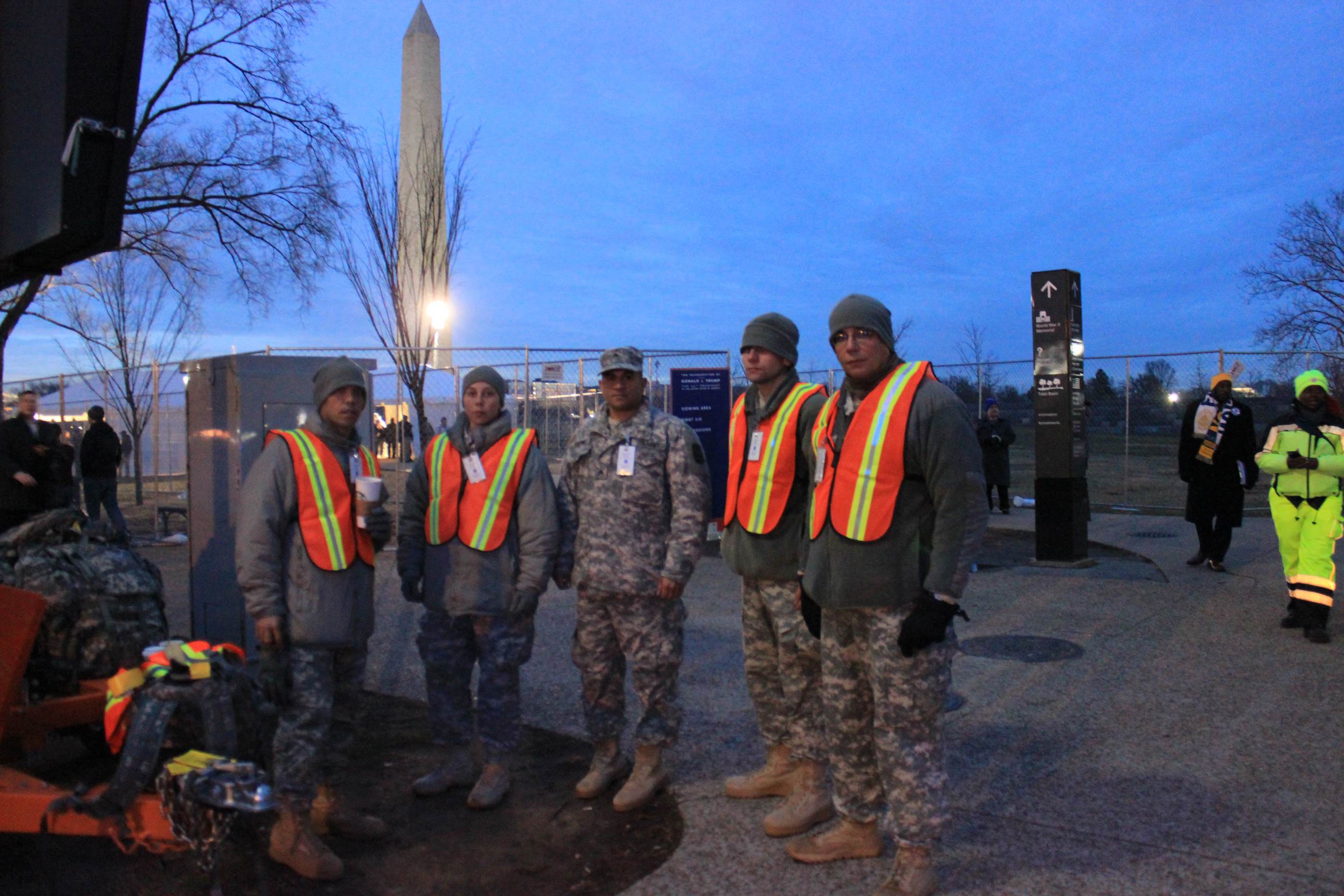
Guardsmen at the 58th presidential inauguration

The Puerto Rico National Guard comprises both Army and Air National Guard components, namely the Puerto Rico Army National Guard and the Puerto Rico Air National Guard respectively, with a total authorized strength of 8,400 citizen-soldiers and airmen. (Note: Vicens (2012; in Spanish) "[...] la Guardia Nacional cuenta con aproximadamente 7,200 soldados en la rama del ejército, 1,200 en la fuerza aérea, para un total de 8,400 ciudadanos-soldados y aviadores federales y 368 empleados civiles en apoyo a la fuerza militar federal [...]") The Constitution of the United States specifically charges the different National Guards with dual federal and state missions. The Puerto Rico National Guard is the only United States military force empowered to function in a state/territorial status within Puerto Rico. Those functions range from limited actions during non-emergency situations to full-scale law enforcement of martial law when local law enforcement officials can no longer maintain civil control.

The Puerto Rico National Guard may be called into federal service in response to a call by the president of the United States or Congress, usually at the request of the governor of Puerto Rico. When under state/territory control, the governor serves as commander-in-chief. When troops from the Puerto Rico National Guard are called to federal service, the president serves as commander-in-chief. The federal mission assigned to the different National Guards is: "To provide properly trained and equipped units for prompt mobilization for war, national emergency or as otherwise needed."

The governor of Puerto Rico may call individuals or units of the Puerto Rico National Guard into state service during emergencies or to assist in special situations in which National Guard use is appropriate. The state mission assigned to the National Guard is: "To provide trained and disciplined forces for domestic emergencies or as otherwise provided by state law."

== History ==
=== Spanish colonial period (1510–1898) ===
The PRNG claims direct descent from the Puerto Rican militias that were founded after the Spanish Empire granted the island a governor and general captain. Its first large conflict emerged from the response to the Spanish–Taíno War of San Juan–Borikén, only years after the arrival of Juan Ponce de León and before the totality of Puerto Rico was under Spanish sovereignty. The Taínos of Borikén, led by Agüeybaná II were forced into labor and their territory threatened by the Spanish expansionism in the region, consequently deciding to begin a counteroffensive by killing Cristóbal de Sotomayor, the leader of a settlement built in southern Puerto Rico. Lacking a formal structure during the initial stages of the colonization, the Spanish settlers were forced to adopt a military initiative and organize these militias, while also continuing their main jobs, giving rise to the first civilian reserves. Additional native attacks took place in 1514 and 1520 (by which point they had been driven into exile in the Lesser Antilles). During this decade, French buccaneers would also become a threat, attacking the archipelago in 1528, only for more exiled Taínos to attack the following year. Hostile adversaries would make a single incursion during the following decade, one was an attack attributed to island Caribs (in 1556) and the other a French attack, the only reported during the following thirty years. However, the 1570s saw a surge in activity, with buccaneers attacking in 1570 and 1576 and the natives in 1573.

Puerto Rico was considered a strong strategic point by the Spanish Empire due to its location as the last bastion before taking the transatlantic voyage to Europe, and due to this fortification of its ports began during the second half of the 16th century. The first major attack faced by the militias was led by Francis Drake in 1595, leading thousands of men in the Battle of San Juan but being repelled. In 1598, George Clifford, 3rd Earl of Cumberland managed to take the city in the second Battle of San Juan after battling his way through the local militias, but was forced to leave two months later due to an epidemic. Despite this setback, the local militias earned enough of a reputation for the next governor, Alonso de Mercado, to reportedly send back most of the soldiers that accompanied him in his voyage and rely on them for defensive purposes. The main fortress of San Juan Bay, El Morro, was finished by 1608 and additional fortifications such as San Cristóbal soon followed. The next major engagement took part 27 years later, when the Netherlands led another failed invasion in the third Battle of San Juan. The militias would also participate in military incursions in other adjacent islands, including some that are now part of the Puerto Rican archipelago.

In 1765, Marshall Alejandro O'Reilly who would later become known as "El Padre de las Milicias", reorganized the militias and created a group that was disciplined enough to fight in regular combat at the Anglo-Spanish War and be commended by the crown. In 1797, the British attempted another invasion, this time led by Ralph Abercrombie, but were defeated by a force that heavily depended on the local militias in the fourth Battle of San Juan. In 1868, amidst a growing pro-independence in the population that eventually lead to the Grito de Lares, the Spanish government decided to replace the mostly Puerto Rican quorum of the militias with an Institute of Volunteers that was completely composed of Spanish-born citizens. During the decades that followed, the loss of several former colonies and of influence in the continent affected the maintenance of the local military installations and of the force, leading to an ill-prepared force with which to face the Hispano-American War.

=== Early American colonial period (1898–1938) ===
In 1906, a group of men led by Commissioner of Interior Lawrence H. Grahame decided that there was a need to create a national guard that mirrored those in the states in order to replace the militias. Companies were created in Yauco, Juana Díaz, Peñuelas, Ponce and San Juan. This entity was initially dependent on volunteers that were trained in El Morro, none of which received a salary. However, the colonial legislature failed to approve a project that was meant to authorize the organization and seek funding, causing the initiative to be halted.

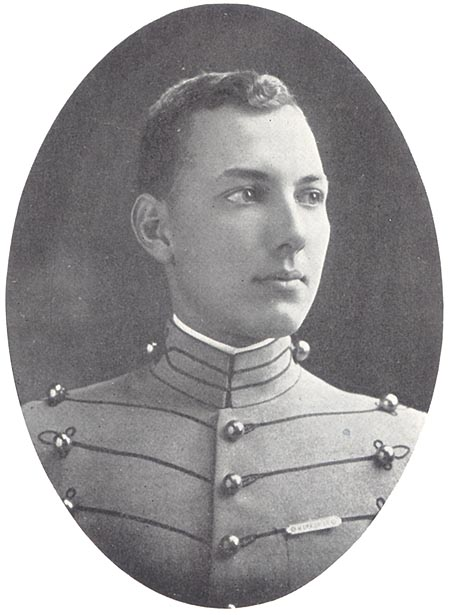
Cadet Luis R. Esteves, 1915

With the onset of World War I and the mobilization of the 373rd, 374th and 375th regiments of the Regular Army, the need for a local military force became evident as some 20,000 men were trained in Camp Las Casas. As soon as the war concluded, a local officer, Luis Raúl Estevez, inquired colonial governor Arthur Yager about reactivating the national guard, an initiative that gained the support of the official and the colonial legislature.

On July 19, 1919, Congress passed a law approving the budget for the following year to meet the requirements of the National Defense Act of 1916. Adjutant General John Wilson was given command over the nascent organization. On July 19, 1919, the United States Department of War informed Yager about the administration's intention of supporting a local reserve pursuant to the statutes of this law to create a permanent national guard that was capable of assisting the other branches of the military or working independently. The entity resumed operation and was meant to receive an infantry brigade, with artillery, cavalry, engineering and specialized troops. Esteves became the first commander of the current interaction of the PRNG. Company A was organized under Cpt. Luis Irizarry on November 23, 1919. The unit was trained in terrains and buildings that were lent by Carmelo Alemar of the Agricultural Experimental Station. Company B was organized on February 1, 1920, and was separated a week later in two companies stationed in San Sebastián (Company M) and Lares (Company L) which were later formally organized. On February 7, 1920, several new companies were organized, including Company E in Ponce, Company G in Yauco. On February 25, 1920, the First Regiment Puerto Rico Infantry was provisionally organized under Mayor Luis Esteves, receiving Companies A, B, M, L, E, G and Headquarters.

Company F was organized on March 7, 1920, in Peñuelas. The following week, Company I was organized at Arecibo. On April 13, 1920, Company C was organized in Cabo Rojo. On April 25, 1920, Company H was organized at Sabana Grande.

On April 30, 1920, the First Regiment received command of a number of headquarters at San Juan, Mayagüez and Sabana Grande. On May 9, 1920, Company D was organized at San Germán. Towards the month's end, Company K was organized at Bayamón. On May 30, 1920, the designation of Company B was reassigned to a company in Maricao. That same day, Troop A of the First Squadron P.R. Cavalry was organized in Mayagüez.

The First Infantry Regiment was formally recognized on June 2, 1920, before becoming the 295th Infantry Regiment two years later. With Esteves as its senior instructor, The regiment is symbolically considered the older within the structure of the US national guards due to its claim. On June 14, 1920, the First Infantry Medical Detachment was organized in Mayagüez. On June 17, 1923, the 296th was separated as a splinter, with its first Battalion winning recognition for best company in the national guard twice. The First Regiment's First Headquarters Company was organized in Bayamón three days later. Later that week, the first PRNG band was organized at Mayagüez. The First Regiment's Machine Gun Company was organized at San Juan on September 19, 1920. More than two months later, its Supply Company was organized at San Juan. The first annual exercises began on December 6, 1920, at Salinas, during the following years this camp would be moved throughout the camps.

In the 1920s, several groups dedicated to target shooting were scattered throughout Puerto Rico, with the PRNG deciding to organize competitions. On November 24, 1930, personnel from the entity founded the Ponce Rifle and Sporting Club, later affiliating itself with the National Rifle Association of America. The PRNG itself would promote these events, forming the Puerto Rico National Guard Shooting Club presided by Salvador Roig.

The national guard was mobilized after the passing of hurricane San Felipe in 1928 and San Ciprián in 1932. During these disasters, they were assigned civil assistance. Similar interventions took place in the Dominican Republic and Haiti. In 1933, the 296th First Battalion won the Harrison Cup.

On May 3, colonial governor Winship argued for a light artillery unit. On March 16, 1936, the PRNG underwent a reorganization. In February 1934, Gen. George Leach, who oversaw Company A of the 295th, visited Puerto Rico and was surprised to see that the bayonets had been repaired motu proprio with local resources and their discipline, promoting him to pronounce during a speech that he had "inspected the national guards of the 48 states" and not seen one better prepared than the PRNG, going to the extent that if the president asked which was the best regiment for defense, it would be the 295th. The 296th remained under the supervision of the 295th until June 1, 1936, when it was designated as a regiment under Col. Luis Irizarry. In 1937, the 296th first Battalion was reassigned to the 295th as Company A. In 1938, the PRNG joined the 65th Infantry Regiment and participated in exercises supervised by Gen. Frank Ross McKoy. On July 25, 1938, Irizarry was killed during an assassination attempt against colonial governor Winship in one of several confrontations between the government and the Puerto Rican Nationalist Party following the events of the Ponce massacre. Col. José Enrique Colom took over the 296th Regiment.

In 1938, the 295th, 65th and 296th Regiments and other personnel from the PRNG joined the Regular Army in a number of military exercises also involving the Navy. The three regiments formed a brigade that was led by brigadier general Walter Short and was given jurisdiction over Puerto Rico in case of military action. The following two years, annual training was held in Arecibo and Tortuguero in anticipation to the impending activation in the newly declared World War II. Wilson died in December 1938, and months later Luis Raúl Esteves was given command of the PRNG. On August 3, 1939, the national guard paid homage to the colonel of the 296th, José Colom, who was serving as interim governor of Puerto Rico, with a mass march (the first of this kind held under the colonial administration) to commemorate Governor's Day. In turn, Colom handed several recognitions to the companies and soldiers that distinguished themselves during the year.

On January 8, 1940, an emergency camp was held and a training exercise where an invasion of the northern coast of Puerto Rico was being invaded, in particular the municipalities of Arecibo and Vega Baja, and the 295th and 296th were tasked with repelling it. Both were placed in charge of solving a tactical exercise, code named MUSKETRY, which involved a sudden appearance by a hostile force. In March 1940, a new military code for Puerto Rico was presented to the colonial legislature along other initiatives related to the PRNG. The final annual camp prior to activation in World War II was the longest yet, lasting three weeks. On May 19, 1940, the PRNG was mobilized to attend the flooding caused by Rivera Portugués and Bucaná in Ponce.

During this time, the PRNG underwent a reorganization that led to the transfer of guardsmen and units, as well as the creation of new units. In June 1940, the 162nd Battalion of Field Artillery was first organized, with its batteries (A through C) being assigned to San Juan, Río Piedras and Ponce. This same year, the 130th Engineering Regiment received authorization to organize its 1st Battalion, with its companies being assigned to San Juan, Mayagüez and Guayama. The 295th's Company A was reassigned as the 296th's Company K. This reorganization led to the ascension of several officers to accommodate the new units.

=== World War II and reorganization (1938–1950) ===
On October 15, 1940, the PRNG was activated pursuant to Executive Order 3551. A group of 1,359 belonging to 295th Infantry Regiment were assigned to Campamento Tortuguero in Vega Baja, Puerto Rico where training was under seen by Esteves under Col. Miguel A. Muñoz. The 296th had a force of 1,363 and joined the 295th at Tortuguero. The other units, which included those that received formal recognition on this date, were the 92nd Brigade (47 men), the 162nd Artillery Battalion (274 men), the 130th Engineering Battalion (193 men), the 253rd Artillery Battalion (175 men) and the 201st/123rd Artillery Battalion (323 men). Besides San Juan, the municipalities of Ponce, Mayagüez, Vega Baja, Manatí, Arecibo, Bayamón, Caguas, Fajardo, Humacao, Cayey, San Germán, Maricao, Cabo Rojo, Sabana Grande, Peñuelas, Yauco, Aibonito, Coamo, Juana Díaz, Río Piedras, Guayama and Aguadilla had personnel assigned to them. The 130th Regiment was placed under the Regular Army and trained by the 27th Combat Engineering Regiment at Tortuguero, where its Company A was charged with additional constructions.

On March 19, 1941, additional personnel was assigned to the 295th Regiment, and shortly afterwards it was moved to Salinas, Puerto Rico, for further training. On August 12, 1941, Colom left the 296th Regiment and was replaced by Col. Antulio Segarra. The 130th and 27th Engineering were reorganized in a Combat Engineering Regiment in charge of Lt. Col. Sylvester Nordner and continued working on the infrastructure of the local bases.

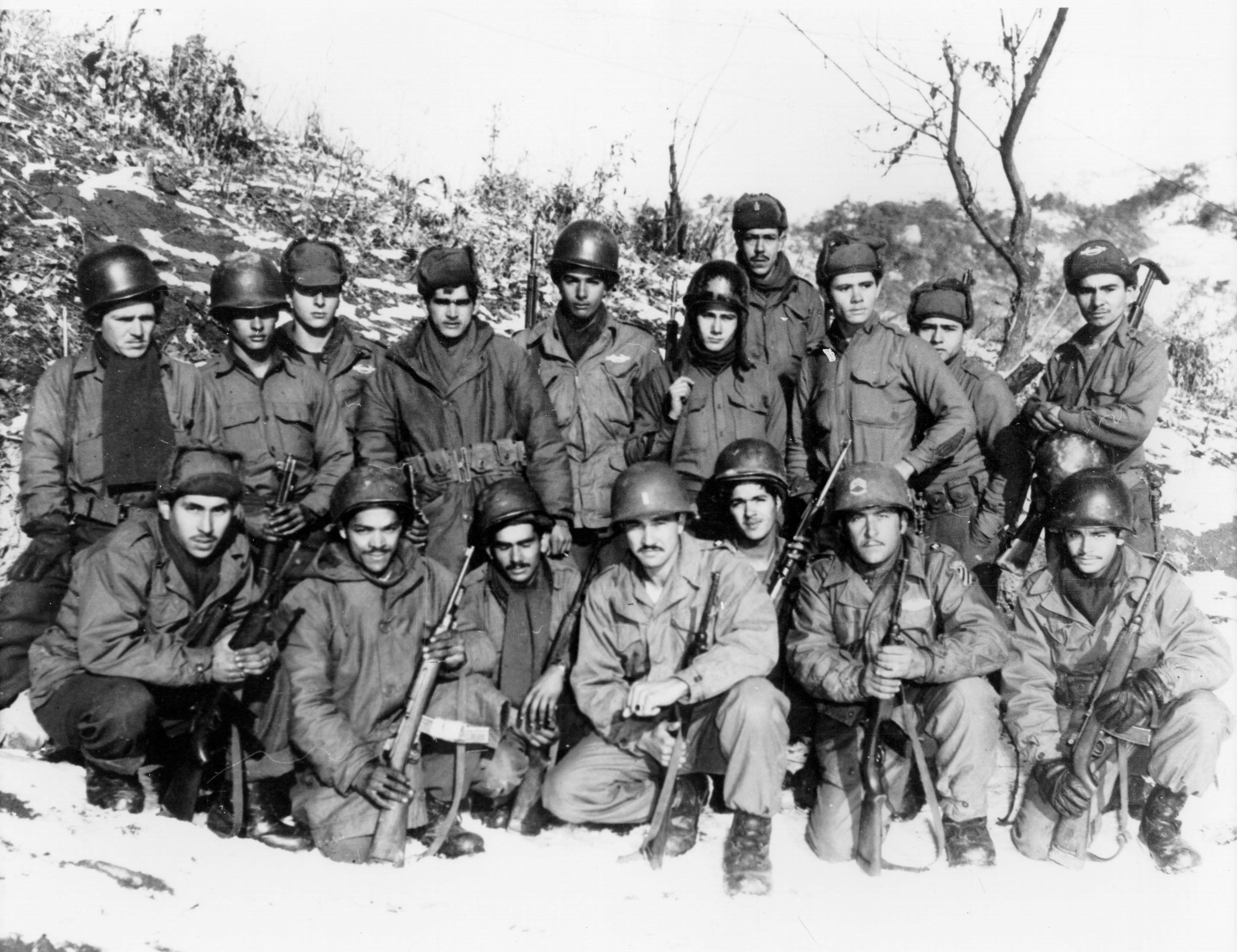
Engineers of the 65th Infantry Regiment in Korea

On December 7, 1941, the PRNG was assigned to surveillance and monitoring operations throughout Puerto Rico. After more than a year performing this task, the 295th Infantry Regiment was separated in two battalions and reassigned to operate in Aruba and Curazao, while the rest of the personnel was placed on detachments and sent in operations that took place in Suriname, Trinidad, Jamaica and Cuba.

On January 7, 1943, the 65th Infantry Regiment was assigned to Panama led by Commander Salvador Roig, with 300 men being transferred from the 296th to complement its force. The remainder of that regiment remained at Camp O'Reilly in Gurabo. On October 30, 1943, Col. Eduardo Andini took over the 296th Regiment. In December 1943 the 295th Infantry Regiment was reorganized in Puerto Rico and the following month began replacement operations in Campanento Tortuguero. That same month, Col. Andrés López Antongiorgi took over the 296th Regiment and its battalions were systematically transported to Panama where it took over the work previously done by the 65th, which was reassigned to North Africa. The regiment also provided 400 men and a Cannon Company to the parting unit. The 266th Regiment was given the task of guarding the Panama Canal Zone, both in the Atlantic and Pacific coasts, and participated in missions in Peru, Galapagos and Ecuador under Col. Francisco Parra Toro. It served in the Mobile Forces, in jungle training and performed before visiting Latin American officials.

Three months later, the 295th Regiment began training at Camp O'Reilly and was later translated to Losey Field. On May 13, 1943, the 162nd Battalion traveled to Panama, where it replaced the 2nd Field Artillery Battalion and was assigned the medical detachment two months later. During the summer, the 295th was assigned to Panama, where replaced the 296th Regiment in the Mobile Force and surveillance operations under Col. Ramón Nadal. There the battalions underwent jungle setting training along Latin American personnel and participated in monitoring of the Atlantic and Pacific oceans. The 130th was re designated 130 Engineer Battalion Combat and placed under Lt. Col. Walter Torres. In June 1943, a large portion of the 130th Puerto Rican officers were sent to Fort Belvoir for training. Later in the year, the 130th was reassigned to Panama and given the task of building a landing strip in the jungle and a bridge between Piña Island and the Panamanian mainland, for which it was commended. On June 27, 1944, the 162nd Battalion returned to the United States and was assigned to Camp Burtner and later to Hampton Road and Fort Jackson. The 296th was reassigned to serve in the Pacific, and on November 11, 1944, Col. Ramón Nadal took over it.

In January 1945, Col. Amaury Gandía took over and lead the 295th Regiment until it was demobilized and returned to Puerto Rico. In Hawaii and accompanied by the 1558th Engineering and the 1114th Artillery, the unit took charge of training at camps Aiea and Kahuco, where the first, second and third battalions were assigned to different locations. The 296th Regiment was trained in anticipation for an impending invasion of Japan, but was later reassigned to work as occupation troops. On April 19, 1945, the 162nd Battalion arrived at France, where it participated in operations held along the Seventh Army, the Sixth Group, 63rd Infantry, VI Army Corps, 84th Army Division and the Third Army. On October it was returned to Puerto Rico, where it remained until its demobilization seven month later. The 130th was sent to Camp Bowie, where they would complete further training an await further mobilization, but the war would end before.

In March 1946, they were returned to Puerto Rico, where it was demobilized shortly after arrival. On May 6, 1946, the 162nd was demobilized and reorganized under Lt. Col. Jaime Fullana, with its batteries being granted recognition between 1947 and 1948.

The conclusion of the war lead to the license and honorable discharge of several members of the PRNG, who wanted to continue their civilian lives. during the summer of 1946, Esteves reorganized the 295th and 296th Infantry Regiments. The Department of War issued a plan where the PRNG would be reorganized into headquarters, two units 295th and 296th, an anti-air group, and numerous battalions, detachments, companies and other specialty groups at a cost of 2.5 million per year. Secretary Patterson, who was once a member of his local national guard, felt an urgency to reorganize the civil guard as soon as possible. In the recruitment initiative that followed, the PRNG would finish second among the 51 national guards affiliated to the USNG, only behind Wyoming, surpassing pre-established goals for a 204% of the total. The most successful recruiter, Arturo Romañat, received a commendation and traveled to Washington where he met several high-ranking officials.

The 296th was placed in charge of Col. Juan Cordero. Company Headquarters for the first and second natal lions were located in Mayagüez and Ponce, with Lieutenant Colonels Rafael Sepúlveda, Manuel Nazario and Invan Domínguez. The 296th's Company A (based in San Germán) became the first unit to complete quorum among all national guards affiliated to the United States following the war, and won the Eisenhower Trophy in consecutive years. Between October and December 1946, other companies were scattered throughout Puerto Rico.

On September 15, 1946, the 295th Infantry Regiment was taken over by Col. Wilson Colberg. This coincided with the establishment of Company Headquarters led by Cpt. Ramón Cantero. The 295th held its first Annual Training under this new regime in August. On November 3, 1946, the first set of commissions were awarded to the new PRNG. Black men were not allowed to enlist in the PRNG until December 3, 1946, when colonial governor Jesús T. Piñero authorized it.

On February 9, 1947, the 482nd Artillery Battalion was organized under Lt. Col. Jacinto Hidalgo, its batteries were organized in San Juan and Cayey throughout the year and one in 1948. Along the 225th Engineering Battalion, reorganized on January 22, 1948, the 296th was fully reorganized. In May 1947, Esteves re-designated several companies of the 295th and 296th in order to facilitate their training with tanks and mortars.

In the summer of 1947, the 296th traveled to Tortuguero to attend its first training camp after reorganizing. The following year, it held its first training at full force. The 296th Regiment received Class A recognition, earning priority status in order of activation. On June 15, 1947, Company K of the 295th was reorganized at Ceiba under Lt. Alejo Rivera, moving from its previous base in Fajardo.

On August 11, 1947, a parade led by the 295th was held in honor of Col. Miguel Muñoz. During the following years, the national guard was involved in training, with Company I of the 296th hosting visiting officers. On September 16, 1948, colonial governor Piñero and president Truman proclaimed the celebration of National Guard Day. During this year, seven su officials were commended by Gen. Ray Porter for their performance at Panama.

=== Korean War, Jayuya Uprising (1950–1953) ===
Shortly after war was declared in Korea, the 65th regiment was activated, with the 296th Regiment taking its place at Puerto Rico on August 11, 1950. Led by Col. César Cordero, who was given control of Camp Tortuguero, the regiment was assigned for training in anticipation for future deployment and waiting for orders from the General Headquarters of the Antilles Department. During the following months, its battalions were scattered throughout Puerto Rico. On September 8, 1950, the municipality of Sabana Grande held an activity in homage of the PRNG.

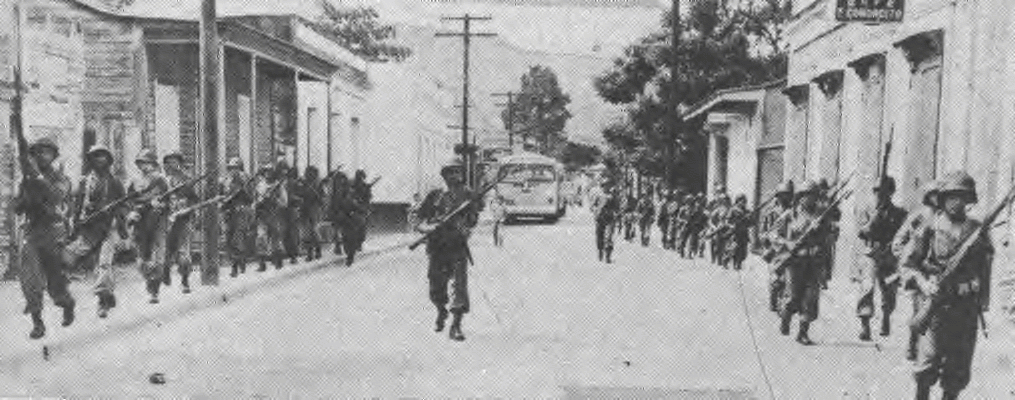
Troops of the Puerto Rico National Guard, commanded by Puerto Rico Adjutant General Major General Luis R. Esteves and under the orders of Governor Luis Muñoz Marín, during the occupation of Jayuya

During the following years, the dichotomy between the government of Luis Muñoz Marín and the Nationalist Party was widened over the Commonwealth that was being negotiated in Congress. On October 30, 1950, these differences materialized in the Jayuya Uprising. The 295th Infantry Regiment was mobilized from the beginning of the insurrection until November 6, 1950. In the crossfire that took place at Utuado, Corporal José Rodríguez Alicea of H Unit in Arecibo was killed. The 296th's First Battalion was mobilized under Lt. Col. Rafael Sepúlveda, was moved to forts Brooke and Buchanan. This revolution was quelled after the Puerto Rico Air National Guard bombed the municipalities of Jayuya and Utuado, the first and so far only time that the United States military has bombed a locale under the jurisdiction of the federal government. Following the crossfire, the PRNG confiscated a flag of Puerto Rico that had been placed before the Jayuya Police Headquarters. For its participation in this conflict, the entity received letters of gratification from the Police of Puerto Rico and other organizations affiliated to the government such as the Puerto Rico Water Resources Authority. In turn, Esteves commended a number of officers for their coordination.

On January 22, 1951, the 296th Regiment was moved to Camp Losey under Col. Cordero. On February 1, 1951, the 296th was formally reorganized. Its units systematically operated at Salinas and training continued in expectation. During this time, the 296th replaced personnel for the 65th Regiment. Chief of Staff J. Lawton Collins visited Puerto Rico and translated Col. Cordero to the 65th, replacing him with Lt. Col. Sepúlveda. Company D of Yauco was the first to complete its quorum, being recognized by the Army on February 15, 1953.

On September 14, 1952, the 296th's Headquarters Company was organized. In 1953, the 296th Annual Training was heavily affected by the moves to service. The PRNG also promoted assistance by awarding a golden cup to units with perfect assistance. Battery B of the 482nd was returned to the jurisdiction of Puerto Rico and received a recognition by the Army.

=== Cold War and governor assignments (1954–1991) ===
Brigadier Gen. Kenneth Sweany attended the summer training in July 1954, expressing satisfaction following the Governor's Day parade that culminated it. On November 19, 1954, the Regular Army formally returned the designation of 296th Regiment to the PRNG in an activity hosted by Muñoz Marín, this under new administrative personnel due to several former members remaining in active service. Detachments were then assigned to several municipalities. The Regiment was able to gather enough troops, but the officers were scarce due to active service and the Inactive Reserve. Other moves included the adoption of a fighting cock as new insignia and the establishment of a periodical. The efficiency of the personnel was gauged in shooting competitions, with the results being sent back to the USNG for comparison with other national guards. In 1955, a Commission of the House of Representatives supervised the PRNG's exercises to gauge the entity's efficiency. During the passing of Hurricane Santa Clara, the 296th's Company I provided support to the government. The 296th's Engineering Company 225 was tasked with the construction of a bridge.

The PRNG underwent another reorganization on February 15, 1959. The tank companies of the 295th and 296th Regiments were assigned to the first battalion in Ponce. Several pre-existing companies were reassigned into the creation of the new Group 65. Several other companies were reassigned new names and purpose, including the 162nd, 482nd and 123rd Battalions. On February 15, 1959, the 296th was assigned to Mayagüez under Col. Raúl Mercado. This same date the 92nd Brigade was returned to the PRNG, after having been formed from the 295th and the 296th in 1940 and reassigned to the Puerto Rico Military Department the following years. The 295th and 296th Regiments, 192nd Battalion, 162nd Second Support Battalion, 892nd Engineering Company, Rangers E Company and Troop E of the signaling platoon were placed under it. In 1955, the 296th's Company G won the local National Guard Trophy and the Pershing Trophy, beating other national guards in the Third Area of the South. On April 30, 1957, Esteves retired from service due to health concerns. Gen. Juan Cordero took office on October 1, 1958, and was ascended to the rank of brigadier general.

On February 21, 1960, commemorated as National Guard Day, the 65th Infantry Regiment was transferred from the Regular Army to the PRNG, in an activity where Gen. Cesár Cordero handed the unit's colors to Col. Rafael Rodríguez. During this time, governor Luis Muñoz Marín took over the office of adjutant general. On September 5, 1960, the PRNG was activated to attend a series of building and bridge collapses caused by floods brought by the adjacent passing of Hurricane Donna, which lead to the deaths of 149 civilians. In December 1961, the PRNG was involved in the reception of John F. Kennedy during his visit to Puerto Rico.

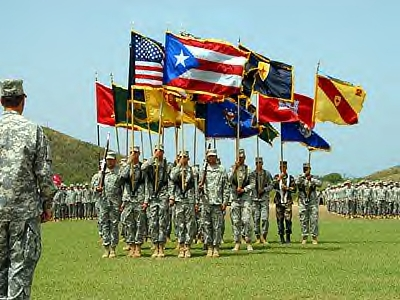
Puerto Rico National Guardsmen in 2012

The Military Academy of the Puerto Rico National Guard was established on June 1, 1963, at Camp Tortuguero on an initiative of César Cordero. Its curriculum was equivalent to Fort Benning's and lasted for a year and 15 days, at which point graduates received their certification. The institution was subsequently moved to Henry Barracks in Cayey and from there to Campamento Santiago. On May 1, 1964, the PRNG underwent another reorganization, the second under Gen. Cordero. On March 20, 1966, Salvador Roig was placed in charge of the PRNG by Roberto Sánchez Vilella. The PRNG also engaged in other civil activities, such as cooperativism (several becoming involved with Cooperativa El Sentinela) and inter-agency softball tournaments.

In 1968 and 1969, Gen. Alberto Picó created the Civic Medical Service Program led by Support Battalion 192's Company B and the 201 Surgery Hospital of the Mobile Army, first offering service to the communities of Salinas. The initiative then moved to the municipality of Culebra. Other municipalities treated during this time include Aibonito, Coamo, Orovovis, Vega Baja, Guánica, Ponce, San Juan, as part of yearly trainings, requests or emergent circumstances. Similar operations held at Utuado in 1974, led to a recognition by the House of Representatives. On January 10, 1969, Picó was promoted to Adjutant General. The Civic Action and Rehabilitation from Disaster and Rescue Program was established parallel to this, with the expressed intention of aiding civic organizations in non intrusive ways following natural disasters. Under this initiative, the 892nd Company and personnel from the 130th of Engineering was engaged in projects such as reconstructing damaged roads, the removal of debris and replacing bridges. They also attended some civic and government requests, particularly during training exercises. The PRNG was also involved in the activities of Constitution Day on July 25. Other activities included raising funds for civic organizations, specific constructions, disposing of garbage, building restorations, and cooperating with the Boy Scouts of America. On October 9, 1970, the PRNG was activated to attend a series of floods, mobilizing 265 men which remained in service for a period of ten days. The entity's role in this event was mostly focused on the evacuation of victims and providing supplies in cooperation with other government agencies. For these efforts, a number of government functionaries sent letters to Gen. Picó, in which they thanked him for the services provided.

On February 1, 1973, Chardón was named Adjutant General and ascended to the rank of brigadier general. On July 6, 1973, Rafael Hernández Colón activated the PRNG in response to a strike being declared in the Autoridad de Fuentes Fluviales. The 92nd Brigade and other units were in service for a week under Brigadier General Salvador Padilla. On November 28, 1974, Hernández Colón activated the national guard again, this time in response to a strike being declared in the Puerto Rico Aqueducts and Sewers Authority. This time, the PRNG remained in service for two weeks. On September 6, 1975, Salvador Padilla was named Adjutant General of the PRNG. The following month, Tropica Storm Eloise passed near the North Coast of Puerto Rico, with a large number of guardsmen voluntarily joining the Civil Defense in the evacuation, clearing of debris, transportation and the management of Assistance Centers that followed. On January 2, 1977, Orlando Llenza was promoted to brigadier general and named Adjutant General of Puerto Rico. During this decade, the PRNG also transitioned to the Joint Uniform Military Pay System (JUMPS). On May 1, 1983, González was named General Adjutant of Puerto Rico.

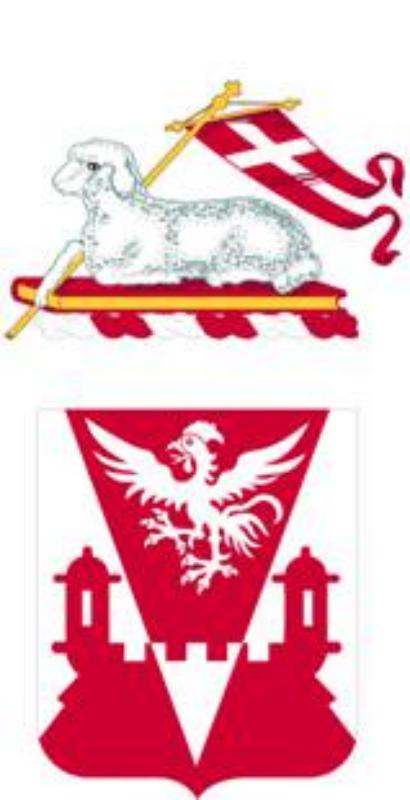
130th Engineer Battalion

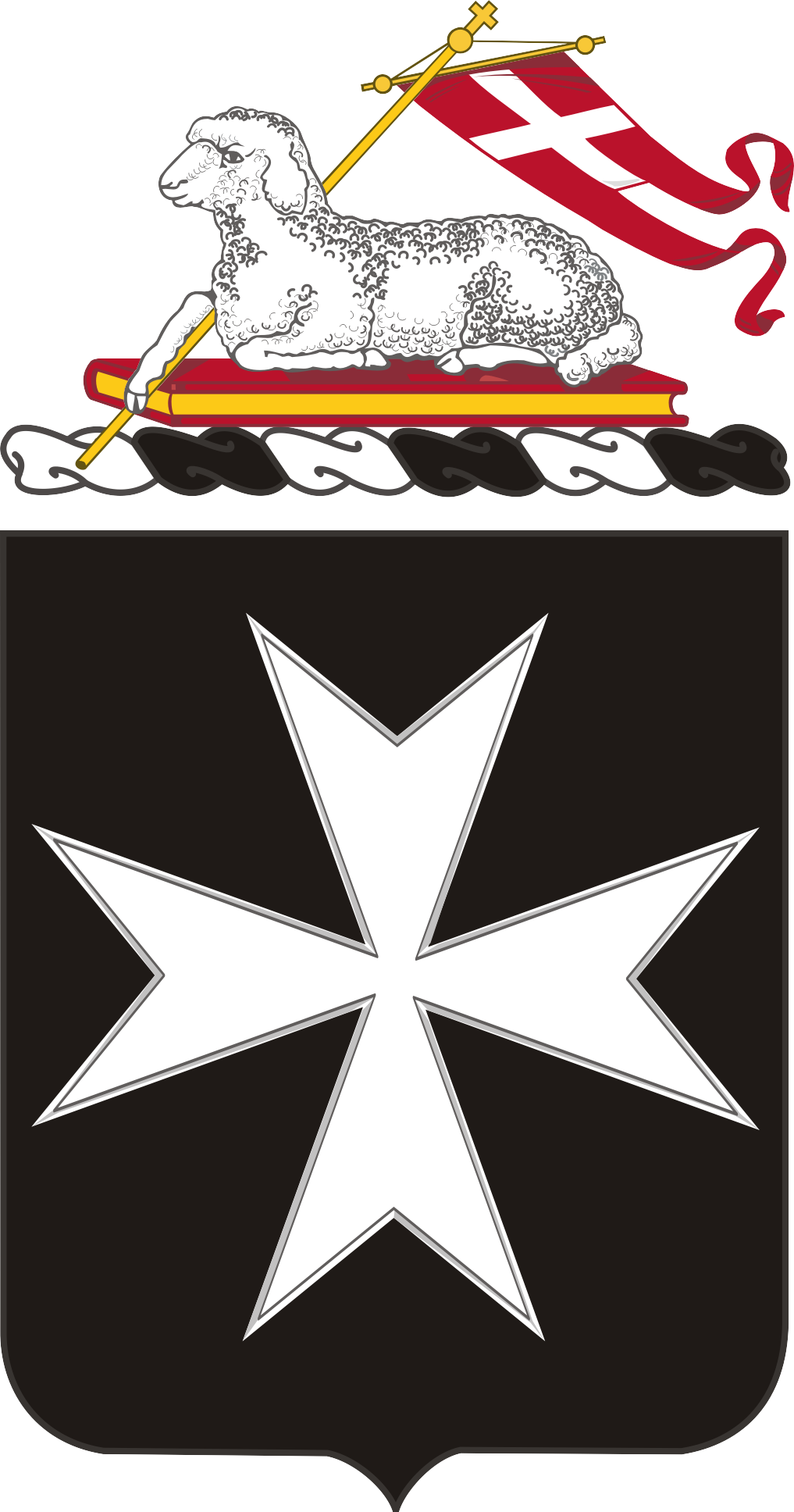
65th Infantry Regiment "The Borinqueneers"

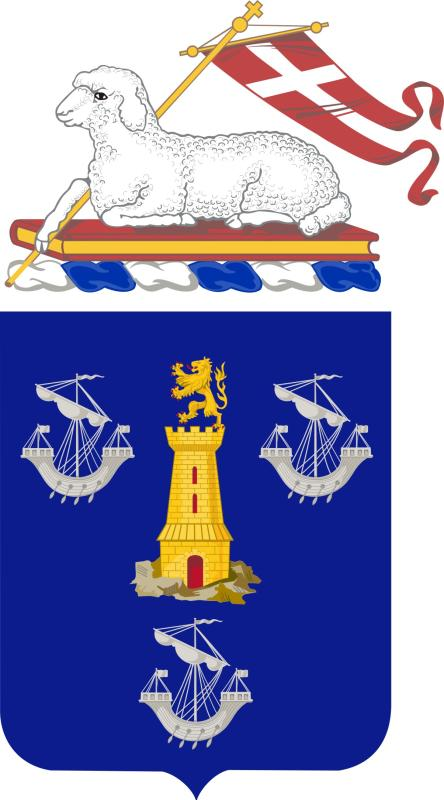
295th Infantry Regiment

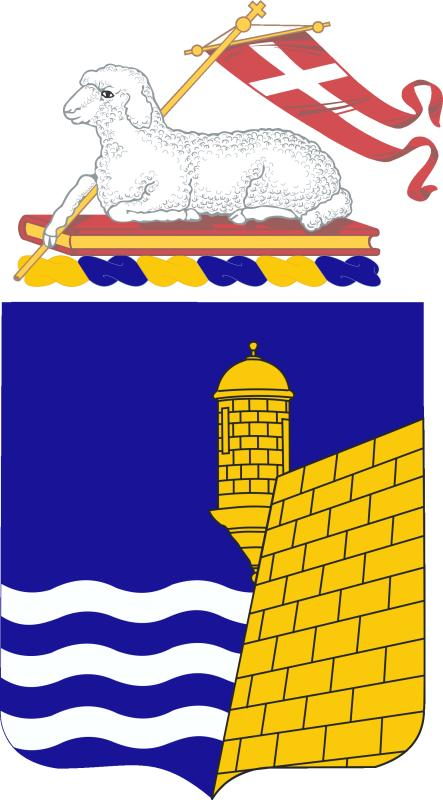
296th Infantry Regiment "Los Cocorocos"

== Branches ==
- Executive branch of the government of Puerto Rico
- National Guard Bureau
- United States Department of the Army
- United States Department of the Air Force
  - Puerto Rico National Guard
    - Puerto Rico Army National Guard
      - 92nd Military Police Brigade
      - 101st Troop Command
      - 191st Regional Support Group
    - Puerto Rico Air National Guard
      - 156th Wing
    - Puerto Rico State Guard
      - 1st Air Base Group

== Adjutant General ==
The adjutant general is the executive officer and commander of both the Puerto Rico National Guard and the Puerto Rico State Guard.

- 1919–1938: John A. Wilson.
- 1938–1957: Luis R. Esteves.
- 1957–1958: Eduardo Andino
- 1958–1965: Juan César Cordero Dávila
- 1965–1968: Salvador T. Roig
- 1969–1972: Alberto A. Picó
- 1973–1979: Carlos Fernando Chardón
- 1975–1977: Salvador M. Padilla Escabi
- 1977–1983: Orlando Llenza
- 1983–1985: Luis González Vales
- 1985–1990: Alfredo J. Mora
- 1990–1993: William Miranda Marin
- 1993–2001: Emilio Díaz Colón
- 2001–2007: Francisco A. Marquez
- 2007–2009: David Carrión Baralt
- 2009–2013: Antonio J. Vicens.
- 2013–2014: Juan José Medina
- 2014–2017: Marta Carcana (note: Carcana held the position since 2014 unofficially, however in 2015 she was officially named Adjutant General)
- 2017–2019: Isabelo Rivera
- 2019–2023: José J. Reyes
- 2023–2025: Miguel A. Méndez
- 2025–present: Carlos J. Rivera Román

== Military installations ==
- Camp Santiago Joint Maneuver Training Center on 16,000 acres of land located in Salinas, Puerto Rico is the island's premier National Guard training facility. Though it has no permanent residents, Camp Santiago can house thousands of troops on a temporary basis. Some old barracks are being replaced with new two-level barracks. In addition to rifle and small arm ranges, a leadership reaction course, and dining facilities and classrooms, Camp Santiago houses a Puerto Rico National Guard Museum, a theater, a Class Six Shoppette and, since 2009, a post exchange on base. A $1.7 million Urban Assault Course is to be constructed at Camp Santiago. National Guard units from other states also come to Camp Santiago for their two weeks annual training. In 1975 the facility was renamed from Camp Salinas to Camp Santiago in honor of Specialist Four Héctor Santiago-Colón, who received the Medal of Honor during the Vietnam War. Salinas was Santiago's birthplace.
- Fort Allen, located 4 miles (6.4 km) south of Juana Díaz, is the site of the Puerto Rico National Guard Language Center. Many PRNG and U.S. Army Reserve units are stationed at Fort Allen. The National Guard's Youth Challenge Program operates at Fort Allen, graduating hundreds of high school students each year who had formerly dropped out of school. The Relocatable Over the Horizon (ROTHR) receiver site has operated at Fort Allen since the 1990s; it is part of a surveillance network designed to monitor flights over an area encompassing more than 1,000,000 square miles (2,600,000 km^{2}) in South America. The (ROTHR) radar consists of 34 antennas and support structure from 71 to 123 feet (37 m) tall. Barracks can house military personnel on a temporary basis, NGX has a post exchange on base, and an Armed Forces Reserve Center is under construction. Previously Fort Allen was used by the US Army as the Losey Army Airfield during WWII, and later used as a U.S. Navy communications center. Since 1980, Fort Allen has been under control of the Puerto Rico National Guard.
- Joint Forces Headquarters Puerto Rico (JFHQPR-Puerto Rico National Guard) A $33.5 million Readiness Center located at the Fort Buchanan Army Garrison provides command and control for the Puerto Army National Guard and Puerto Rico Air National Guard.
- Muñiz Air National Guard Base in Carolina is the home of the Puerto Rico Air National Guard 156th Airlift Wing and the 198th Airlift Squadron. Also, at Muñiz ANGB are located the headquarters of the 1st Air Base Group, the air support division of the Puerto Rico State Guard. Muñiz ANGB has hangars, command offices, a recruiting office, classrooms, maintenance shops, a community club, a Family Readiness Center, a post barbershop, and NGX has a post exchange on base. Muñiz ANGB is also the home of the STARBASE youth program in Puerto Rico. Operation Coronet Oak shares Muñiz ANGB flight line with the 156th Airlift Wing, which also flies C-130 military transport airplanes. In 1963 this Air base was renamed Muñiz Air National Guard Base while commemorating the 20th year of its federal recognition.
- Punta Borinquen Radar Station located next to Punta Borinquen Golf Course at the former Ramey Air Force Base is home for the Puerto Rico Air National Guard's 141st Air Control Squadron.
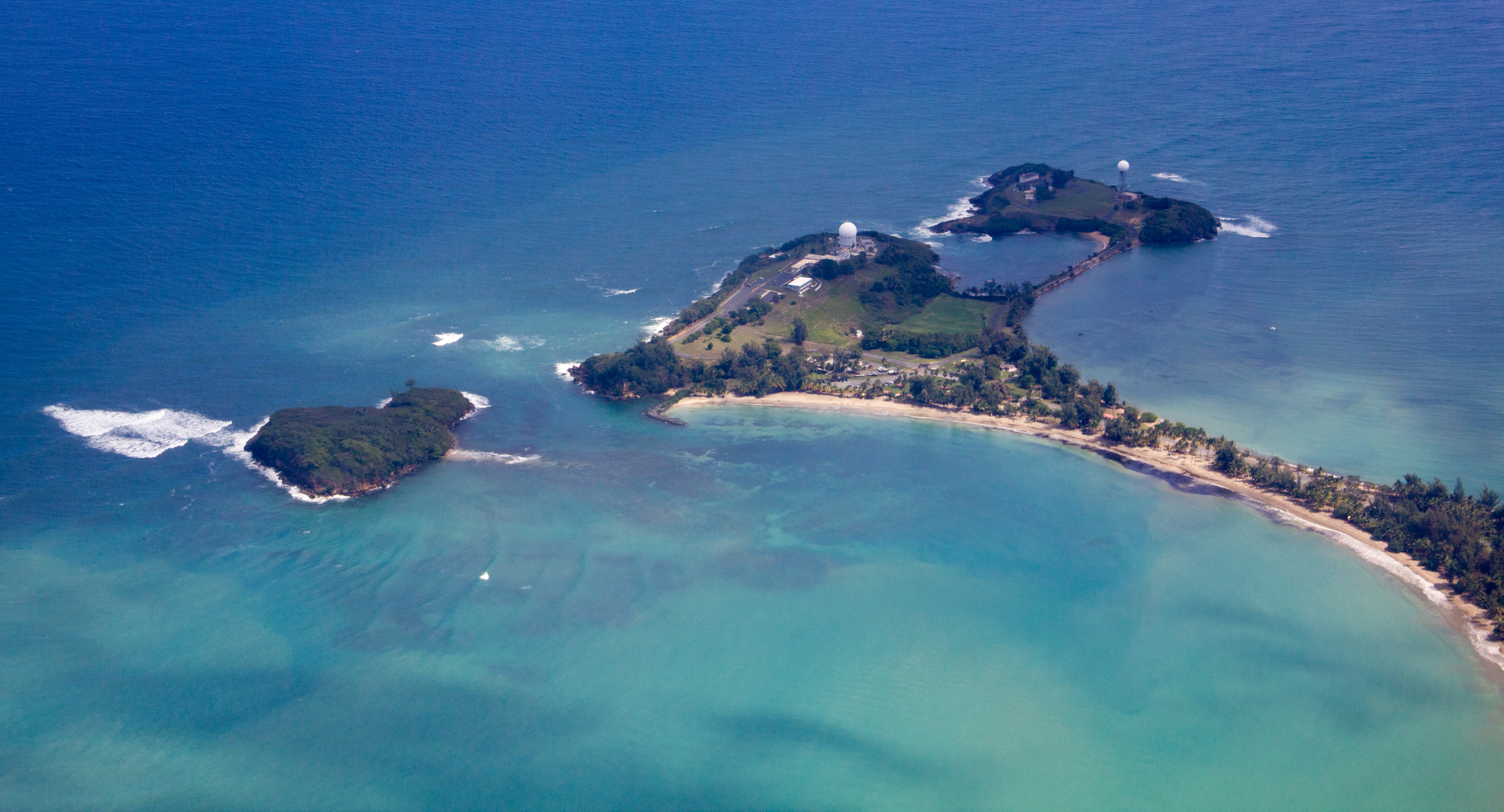
- Punta Salinas Radar Site
  Punta Salinas Radar Site in Toa Baja home of the Puerto Rico Air National Guard's 156th Operations Group. Its mission is to provide air traffic control to the Federal Aviation Administration, and provide support for military and law enforcement operations.
- Isla Grande Aviation Support Facility is located at the Fernando Luis Ribas Dominicci Airport in San Juan. Its mission is to support the Puerto Rico Army National Guard aviation units.
- Watercraft Support Maintenance Center at the former Naval Station Roosevelt Roads in Ceiba, Puerto Rico is home for the Puerto Rico Army National Guard Landing Craft Detachment, 191st Regional Support Group.
- Puerto Rico Army National Guard armories are located in Aibonito, Aguadilla, Arecibo, Arroyo, Cabo Rojo, Caguas, Cayey, Coamo, Guayama, Gurabo, Humacao, Mayaguez, Peñuelas, Ponce, San German, Utuado, Vega Baja and San Juan. Some Puerto Rico National Guard units moved to Armed Forces Reserve Centers in Ceiba, Mayaguez, Fort Allen and to a new Puerto Rico National Guard Readiness Center in Fort Buchanan.

== Community outreach programs ==
- Drug Demand Reduction Program

The National Guard uses its resources to help the island's youth to be drug-free. The Drug Demand Reduction Program works closely with local law enforcement, education and community-based organizations to reduce the chances of exposure of illegal drugs to American children. They also provide National Guard-led education-based, leadership and motivational programs. Drug Demand Reduction directly interacts with children through their KEY National Initiative, Drug Free Starts with Me. The program visits local schools and communities around the island to increase awareness and motivation, and provide leadership, guidance and support to adolescents about their choice to remain drug-free.

- Youth Challenge Program

This program intervenes with 16- to 18-year-old high school dropouts to help them reclaim their lives; it helps them graduate with the values, life skills, education, and self-discipline necessary to succeed as productive citizens. Founded in the 1990s during the administration of Governor Pedro Rosselló, the program has had thousands of dropouts participate and graduate.

- STARBASE Youth Program

As an acronym of Science and Technology Academies Reinforcing Basic Aviation and Space Education, this youth program is intended to help students from 4th–12th grade to improve their math and science skills through aviation. The program starts in elementary school to attract and prepare students at an early age for careers in engineering and other science-related fields of study. The program principally exposes at-risk children and their teachers to real-world applications of math and science; it includes experiential learning, simulations, and experiments in aviation and space-related fields. The program also addresses drug use prevention, health, self esteem and life skills within a math-and science-based program. Founded in 1995 by SSgt Elaine Montgomery, the program celebrates its 15th anniversary in May, 2010.

== Honors and awards ==
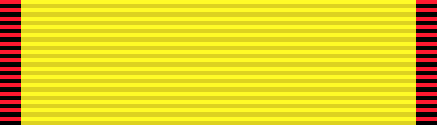
- Military Medal of Honor of the Legislative Assembly of Puerto Rico
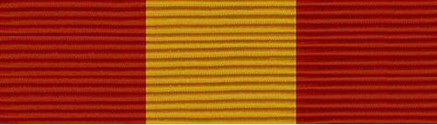
- Puerto Rico Medal for Distinguished Service
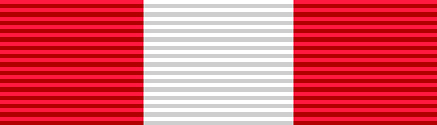
- Puerto Rico Medal of Valor
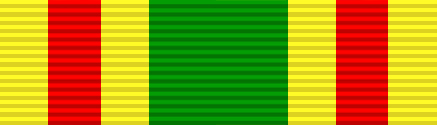
- Puerto Rico Merit Cross
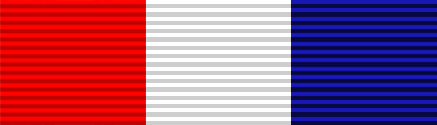
- Puerto Rico Wounded in Action Medal
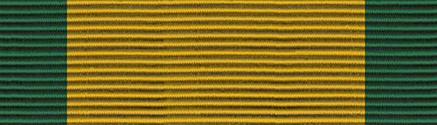
- Order of the Governor of Puerto Rico Common Defense Service Medal
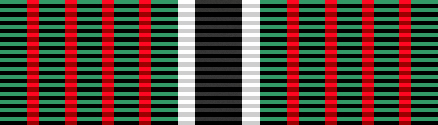
- Puerto Rico Combat Service Medal
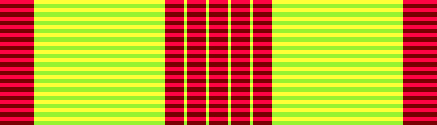
- Puerto Rico Commendation Medal
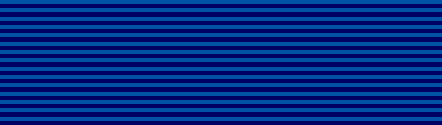
- Puerto Rico Outstanding Soldier/NCO of the Year Ribbon
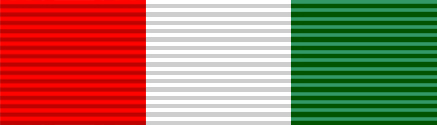
- Puerto Rico Service Medal
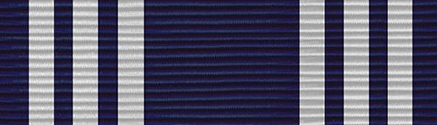
- Puerto Rico Exemplary Conduct Ribbon
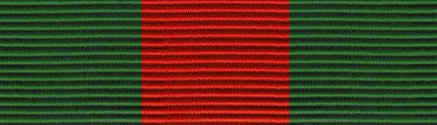
- Puerto Rico War Service Ribbon
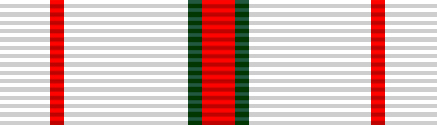
- Puerto Rico Disaster Relief Ribbon
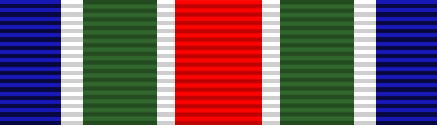
- Puerto Rico Hurricane Georges Ribbon
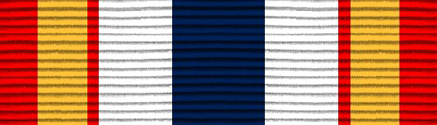
- Puerto Rico Active Duty for Training Ribbon
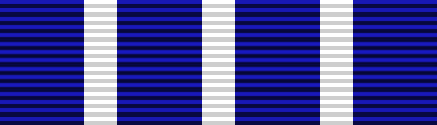
- Puerto Rico Caribbean Emergency Ribbon
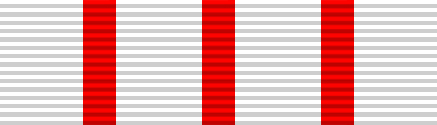
- Puerto Rico Civil Disturbance Ribbon
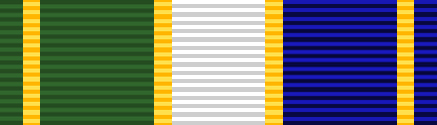
- Puerto Rico Law Enforcement Ribbon
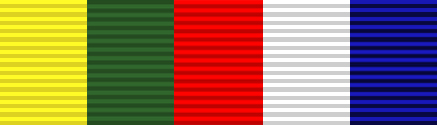
- Puerto Rico VIII Pan-American Games Support Ribbon
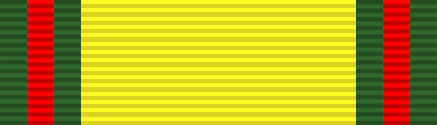
- Puerto Rico English Language Proficiency Ribbon
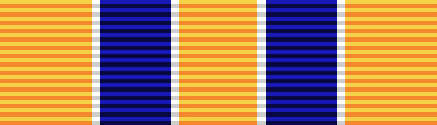
- Puerto Rico Counterdrug Service Ribbon
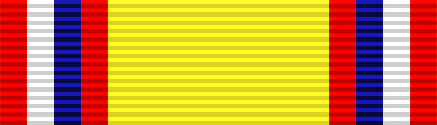
- Puerto Rico 1992 Regatta Ribbon
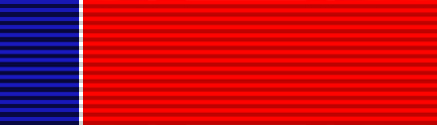
- Puerto Rico Community Service Ribbon

== See also ==
- 65th Infantry Regiment
- Camp Las Casas
- List of Puerto Rican military personnel
- Military history of Puerto Rico
- Puerto Rican Campaign
- Puerto Rican recipients of the Distinguished Service Cross
- Puerto Rican recipients of the Medal of Honor
- Puerto Rican recipients of the Navy Cross
- Puerto Rican women in the military
- Puerto Ricans in the Vietnam War
- Puerto Ricans in World War I
- Puerto Ricans in World War II
- Puerto Ricans Missing in Action - Korean War
- Puerto Ricans Missing in Action - Vietnam War
