= STARBASE =

American military education program

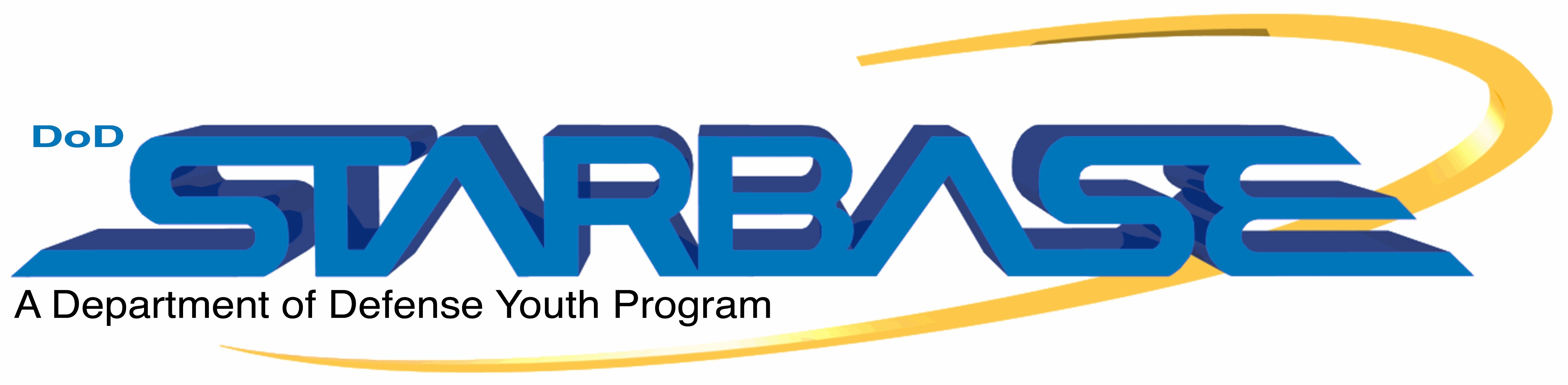
STARBASE Youth Program Logo

Science and Technology Academies Reinforcing Basic Aviation and Space Exploration, STARBASE Department of Defense Youth Program is a nonresidential American military educational program for students (grades K-12) that provides them with real-world applications of math and science. It was created in 1991 through a grant from the Kellogg Foundation. The first STARBASE program began at Selfridge Air National Guard Base in Michigan. The STARBASE program provides an innovative approach to addressing three critical problems facing America’s youth: poor preparation in math and science, lack of personal direction, and drug abuse. The STARBASE mission is accomplished through exciting hands-on curriculam and positive caring role models provided by the STARBASE team and military personnel. Beginning in the fiscal year 1993 (FY93), Congress appropriated $2 million to the Air National Guard (ANG) to establish five STARBASE sites. Today the program is authorized pursuant to 10 U.S.C. § 2193b, as a science and mathematics education improvement program. The Air National Guard, Air Force Reserve, Navy, and Marine Corps participate in this program.

== Program description ==
STARBASE is a nonresidential program for students (grades K-12, though the main focus is grades 4-8) that provides them with real-world applications of math and science through experiential learning, simulations, and experiments in aviation and space-related fields. The program utilizes instruction modules that can integrate state math and science objectives. A motivational module is included to teach children how to set and achieve goals, take positive action in their lives, and build strong self-esteem.

Students and teachers attend the STARBASE school year program for five complete days. During the school year, these days may be consecutive or spread over five weeks; teachers use STARBASE-generated material to reinforce learning during regular school days. In addition to written materials, facilities, simulators, and trainers are made available to the students.

The STARBASE acronym originally stood for "Science and Technology Academies Reinforcing Basic Aviation and Space Exploration". At this time, STARBASE is simply the title of the program, not an acronym.
