= Inter-American Defense College =

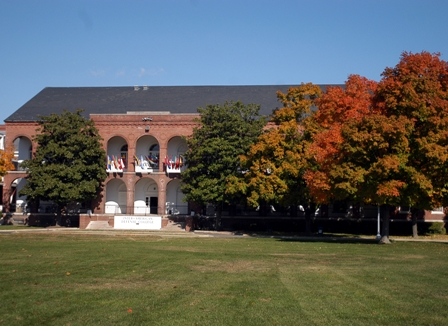
- Latin: Colegium InterAmericanum Defensionis
- Type: Postsecondary Institution, Licensed by the District of Columbia Higher Education Licensing Commission (DC-HELC) and accredited by the Middle States Commission on Higher Education Higher education accreditation
- Established: 9 October 1962
- Affiliations: Organization of American States; Inter-American Defense Board; United States Southern Command; Joint Chiefs of Staff
- Director: Joseph Lestorti
- Students: senior military, police and civilian officials from member nations of the Organization of American States
- Postgraduates: Master's degree in defense and security
- Location: Washington D.C., United States
- Campus: Fort Lesley J. McNair
- Website: iadc.edu

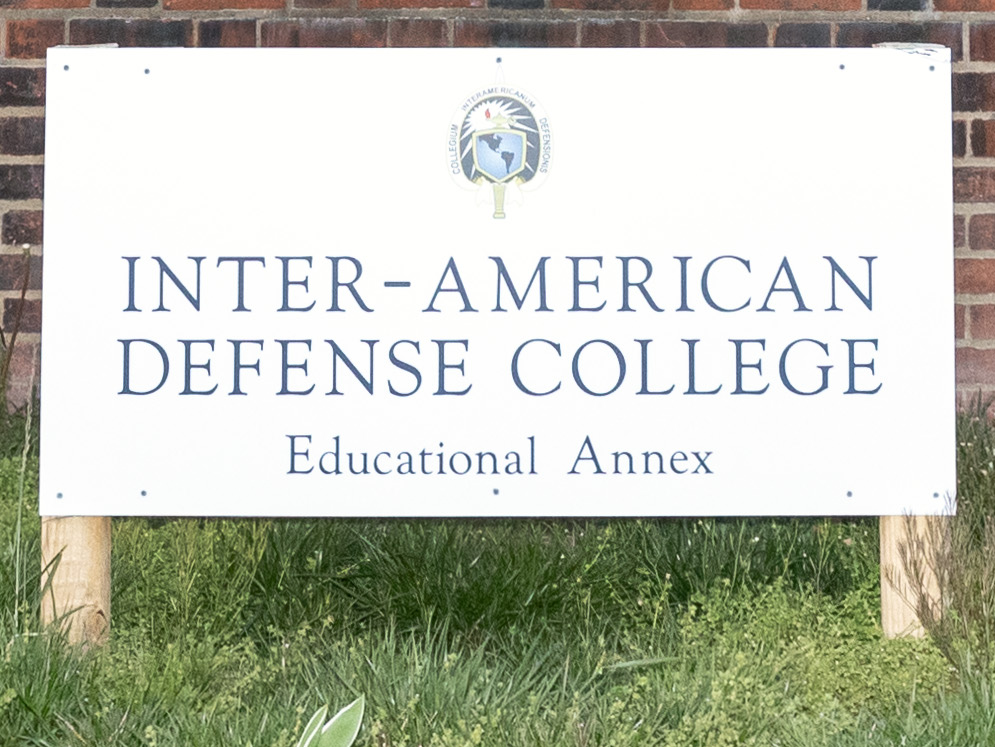
Inter-American Defense College Annex on Fort Lesley J. McNair, Washington D.C., March 21, 2024

The Inter-American Defense College (IADC) is the educational entity of the Inter-American Defense Board, an independent entity of the Organization of American States. The College states that faculty, staff and student body are international, and that broad international participation provides an exceptional opportunity for the free exchange of ideas and forms a foundation for better inter-American understanding. The IADC holds a permanent license from the District of Columbia Higher Education Licensing Commission (DC-HELC) and is accredited by the Middle States Commission on Higher Education.

== Alumni ==
- General Otto Pérez Molina, Guatemalan Army (Ret), Former President of Guatemala
- Michelle Bachelet, who served as the United Nations High Commissioner for Human Rights, from 2018-2022. She is a former President, Minister of National Defense, Minister of Health of Chile, and head of UN Women
- Lucio Gutiérrez, former President of Ecuador
- Paco Moncayo, former Mayor of Quito and General of the Ecuadorian Army during the Alto Cenepa War, current congressman
- Daniel Delgado Diamante, former Minister of Government and Justice of Panama
- Almirante Mariano Francisco Saynez Mendoza, Mexican Navy, Secretary of the Navy (Mexico)
- General Jorge Daniel Castro Castro, Director, Colombian National Police
- General de División Ronaldo Cecilio Leiva, Minister of Defense of Guatemala
- Major General William A. Navas, Jr., US Army (Ret), former Assistant Secretary of the Navy and former Deputy Assistant Secretary of Defense for Reserve Affairs
- Major General Alfred Valenzuela, US Army (Ret), Author of "No Greater Love: The Life and Times of Hispanic Soldiers"
- Major General Antonio J. Vicens, US Army, Adjutant General of the Puerto Rico National Guard
- Brigadier General Antonio J. Ramos, US Air Force (Ret)
- Major General Efrain Vasquez Velazco. Venezuelan Army. (Ret), former Commander of the Venezuelan Army
- Major General William J. Walker, current (38th) Sergeant at Arms of the United States House of Representatives and former Commanding General of the District of Columbia National Guard
