= José Antonio Muñiz =

US Air Force officer, co-founded the Puerto Rico Air National Guard

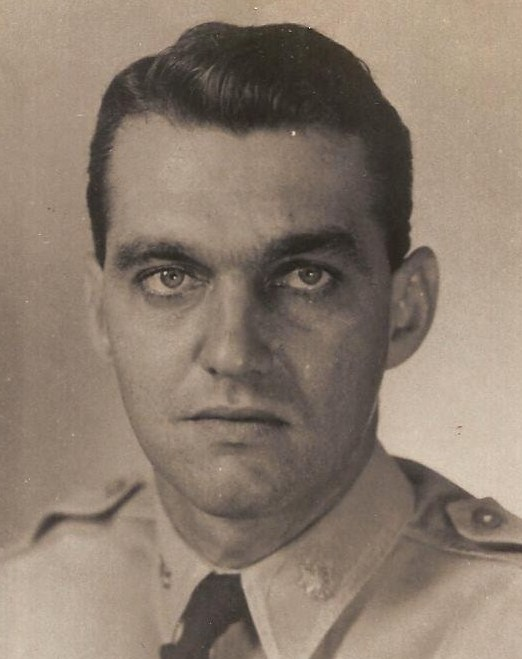
- Lieutenant Colonel José Antonio Muñiz; Co-founder of the Puerto Rico Air National Guard
- Born: October 16, 1919; Ponce, Puerto Rico
- Died: July 4, 1960 (aged 40); San Juan, Puerto Rico
- Burial place: Puerto Rico National Cemetery in Bayamón, Puerto Rico
- Military career
- Allegiance: United States of America
- Branch: United States Army Air Forces (1943-1947), United States Air Force (1953-1957). Puerto Rico Air National Guard (1947-1953; 1957-1960)
- Service years: 1943-1960 (including service in PRANG)
- Rank: Lieutenant Colonel
- Commands: Commander of the 198th Fighter Squadron; Puerto Rico Air National Guard
- Conflicts: World War II; Korean War
- Awards: Air Medal; Soldier's Medal
- Other work: Co-founded the Puerto Rico Air National Guard

Lieutenant Colonel José Antonio Muñiz (October 16, 1919 – July 4, 1960) was a United States Air Force officer who during World War II served in the United States Army Air Forces. He co-founded the Puerto Rico Air National Guard together with then-Colonels Alberto A. Nido and Mihiel Gilormini. In 1963, the Air National Guard Base, at the San Juan International Airport in Puerto Rico, was renamed "Muñiz Air National Guard Base" in his honor.

== Early years ==
Muñiz (birth name: José Antonio Muñiz Vazquez), was born in Ponce, Puerto Rico. There he received his primary and secondary education. He attended the "Colegio Ponceño de Varones" in Ponce and later the University of Puerto Rico (UPR). During his student years, he was a member of that institutions Reserve Officers' Training Corps (ROTC) program.

Like many Puerto Ricans who became interested in aviation, Muñiz made use of the Civilian Pilot Training Program, a federal program which came about with the approval of the Civil Aeronautics Act of 1938. The CPTP used the classrooms of the University of Puerto Rico at Rio Piedras, which was supported by government funds and which provided a pool of young civilian pilots who could be available for military service if war came. Executive Order 8974 was signed on December 12, 1941, transferring the CPTP into a wartime program under the War Training Service (WTS). All WTS graduates were now required to sign a contract agreeing to enter the military following graduation. In 1941, graduated Muñiz from the UPR and ROTC. He received a commission as a 2nd Lieutenant in the United States Army.

== World War II ==
Muñiz joined the United States Army and in 1942 was assigned to the United States Army Air Forces (USAAF), a component of the Army and received additional training as a fighter pilot. The USAAF was the military aviation arm of the United States of America during and immediately after World War II. He served with distinction in the China-Burma-India Theater. During his tour of duty he flew 20 combat missions against the Imperial Japanese Army Air Forces and shot down a Mitsubishi A6M Zero.

== Post World War II and the Korean War ==
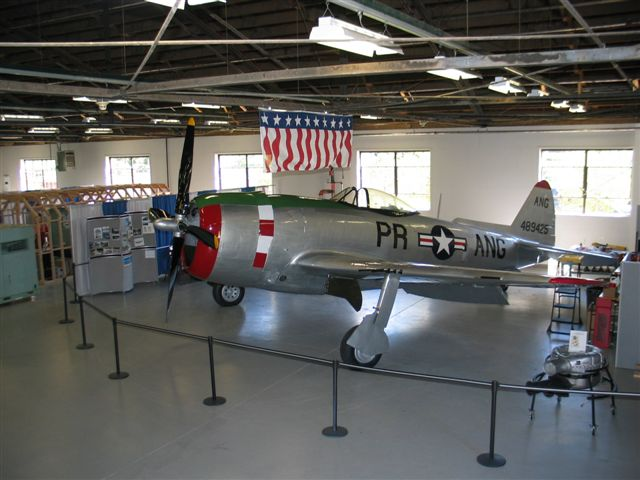
Muñiz's PRANG P-47 on display at Muñiz Air National Guard Base

Muñiz continued in active duty until May 1947. Together with then-Colonels Alberto A. Nido and Mihiel Gilormini, he founded the Puerto Rico Air National Guard (PRANG). During the Korean War he was recalled to active duty and was reassigned to the United States Air Force (aviation military branch which was formed in September 1947). Muñiz served actively in said branch until February 7, 1958.

Upon his return to Puerto Rico, he rejoined the Puerto Rico Air National Guard as Commander of the 198th Fighter Squadron. He served in that capacity until a tragic accident took his life. In 1960, Muñiz was going to fly in a formation of F-86Ds celebrating the 4th of July festivities in Puerto Rico and upon take off his airplane (51-8365) flamed out and crashed. Major General Orlando Llenza, then a fellow aviator in the unit, later described the loss in the following translation:

We were short one pilot and Joe (Muñiz) offered to stand in. I was formation lead. Right after departing the runway, his afterburner nozzles failed open, indicating a loss of power. The ejection seats in use at the time could not safely extract a pilot at low altitude and Joe went in little after takeoff. No one in the flight mentioned the event; we executed the flyover and were notified of the loss upon our return to base. Shortly after that, we received the F-86H which did not use afterburning and could fly non-stop from homestead AFB (in Florida) to San Juan unlike the previous D and E models, which had to stop for fuel at Guantanamo, Cuba.

Muñiz was buried with full military honors at the Puerto Rico National Cemetery in Bayamon, Puerto Rico. Muñiz had married twice. His first wife was Laura Elena Lluberas Kells, who died at an early age of 18, and he had one son from that marriage: Terry Francisco Muñiz Lluberas. His second wife was Sara Emilia Olivari and they had four children: Jose Antonio, Cristina, Ana Elena, and Eric Muñiz Olivari.

== Legacy ==
In 1963, the Puerto Rico Air National Guard Base, at the San Juan International airport in Puerto Rico, was renamed "Muñiz Air National Guard Base" in honor of Lieutenant Colonel Jose Antonio Muñiz Vazquez. The José Antonio Muñiz Memorial is also at this base. Muñiz Air National Guard Base is the home of the Puerto Rico Air National Guard's 156th Airlift Wing and the 198th Airlift Squadron.

In 2020 José Antonio Muñiz was posthumously inducted to the Puerto Rico Veterans Hall of Fame.

== Awards and decorations ==
Among Muñiz's awards and decorations were the following:
Awards:

- Soldier's Medal
- Air Medal
- Air Force Presidential Unit Citation
- Air Reserve Forces Meritorious Service Medal
- American Campaign Medal
- Asiatic-Pacific Campaign Medal
- World War II Victory Medal
- National Defense Service Medal
- Air Force Longevity Service Award
- Korean Service Medal
- United Nations Korea Medal

Badges:

- WW II Army Air Force Pilot Badge
- US Air Force Pilot badge

Patch

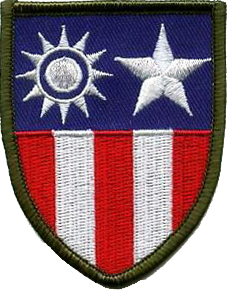
- China Burma India Theater of World War II insignia as a badge

== See also ==
- List of Puerto Ricans
- List of Puerto Rican military personnel
- Puerto Ricans in World War II
- Hispanics in the United States Air Force
- Puerto Rico Air National Guard
