= Alberto A. Nido =

United States Air Force general

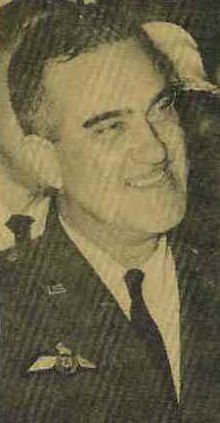
- Brigadier General Alberto A. Nido; Co-founder of the Puerto Rico Air National Guard
- Born: 1 March 1919; Arroyo, Puerto Rico
- Died: 27 October 1991 (aged 72); San Juan, Puerto Rico
- Burial place: Puerto Rico National Cemetery in Bayamón, Puerto Rico
- Military career
- Allegiance: United States of America (also Canada)
- Branch: Royal Canadian Air Force (1941–1942), Royal Air Force (1942–1943); United States Army Air Forces (1943–1947), United States Air Force (1947); Puerto Rico Air National Guard (1947–1975)
- Rank: Brigadier General
- Commands: Puerto Rico Air National Guard
- Conflicts: World War II
- Awards: Distinguished Flying Cross; Air Medal
- Other work: Co-founded the Puerto Rico Air National Guard

Brigadier General Alberto A. Nido (1 March 1919 – 27 October 1991) is a former United States Air Force officer who during World War II served in the Royal Canadian Air Force, the British Royal Air Force and in the United States Army Air Forces. He was also the co-founder of the Puerto Rico Air National Guard.

== Early years ==
Nido was born and raised in the town of Arroyo in Puerto Rico. There he received his primary and secondary education. In 1938, he enrolled in the University of Puerto Rico and studied mechanical engineering in the institution's Mayagüez Campus. During his days as a university student, he decided that he would like to become an aviator for the United States Armed Forces. After he earned his college degree, Nido traveled to the island of Saint Thomas of the U.S. Virgin Islands with the intention of joining the United States Naval Aviation.

Nido passed the physical examination, but he was denied acceptance into the aviation program because of a minor dental problem. According to the examining medical doctor, the fact that he had one tooth that grew above another would make it impossible for him to fly in high altitudes. He then traveled to Washington, D.C., and attempted to join the armed forces there. After passing the physical examination, he was again denied acceptance, for the same reason. Nido then traveled to Tulsa, Oklahoma, and enrolled in the Sparton School of Aviation where in 1941, he received his pilot's certificate.

== Military career ==
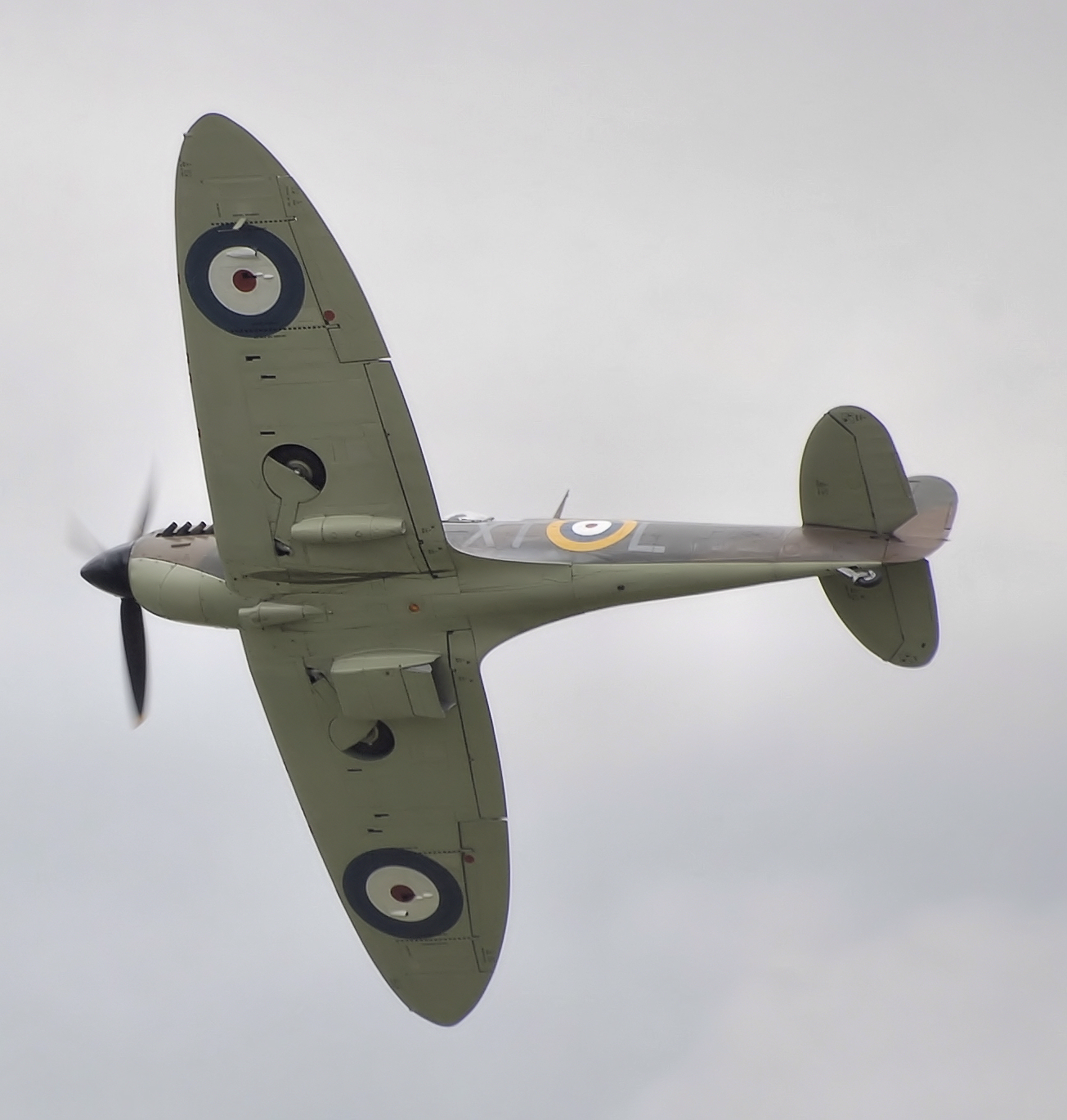
Type of Supermarine Spitfire which Nido flew for the RAF

After he graduated, he was given a job as an aviation instructor at the institution. An officer of the Royal Canadian Air Force (RCAF) who was in Tulsa looking for recruits asked Nido to consider joining them. Nido accepted the offer and in September 1941, he received a telegram from the RCAF office in New York City, requesting his presence at the Waldorf-Astoria Hotel. Nido traveled to New York and on 7 September, was sworn in as a member of the RCAF. After 3 months of intense training in Canada, Nido was commissioned a Flying Officer and sent to an air base in Quebec, where he served as an aviation instructor to bomber pilots and aerial gunners. Nido returned to his homeland, to spend 15 days with his mother and three brothers Rafael, Pedro and Thomas, who were members of the United States Armed Forces. During his stay he met his future wife, Alile Colon, a university student at the "Colegio del Sagrado Corazon", from the town of Yabucoa.

=== World War II ===
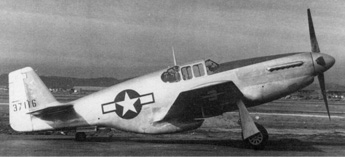
Type of P-51 which Nido flew for the USAAF

On 24 December 1942, Nido was sent to London, England, and participated in the European Theater of the war as a bomber pilot. He was transferred to 610 Squadron of the British Royal Air Force and participated in various combat missions as a Supermarine Spitfire pilot. In November 1943, Nido, then a Captain, was among 10 pilots of the 67th Reconnaissance Squadron who were sent to weather school at RAF Zeals under the command of Colonel T. S. Moorman. His unit participated in 275 missions. Later, in 1943, Nido and 59 other American pilots were transferred to the U.S. Army Air Forces. He was assigned to the 67th Fighter Group as a P-51 Mustang fighter pilot. Nido baptized his P-51 with the name of "Alile" in honor of the girl that he left back home.

== Post World War II ==
After the war he continued to serve in the Army Air Forces and in 1947 became part of the newly formed United States Air Force. On 23 November 1947, the Puerto Rico Air National Guard (PRANG) came into existence as a result of the efforts led by Colonel Alberto A. Nido, Colonel Mihiel Gilormini, and Lieutenant Colonel José Antonio Muñiz. Nido served as commander of PRANG for many years and was later assigned to the National Guard Headquarters as Chief of Staff for Air.

In January 1966, Nido, approached Maj. Gen. Winston P. Wilson, Chief of the National Guard Bureau, inquired about the possibility of constructing a range at the Army Guard's Salinas Training Area (Camp Santiago), located 35 miles south of the coast of Puerto Rico. Two days later, Brig Gen. Salvador Roig approved a plan for this project and assigned Captain Gabriel I. Peñagarícano as project officer. The NGB budgeted $10,000 for this construction; this tight budget required a maximum in-house effort. The U.S. Army Antilles Command, caretakers of the Salinas Training Area, provided earth-moving equipment and personnel to level the target area. They also dug necessary holes for electric power poles, communications and strafing and skip-bombing targets. The range towers were donated by the air depot at McDill AFB and transported directly to the range on C-123 aircraft. Nido, who also served as commander of the local chapter of the "Military Order of World Wars", retired from the military with the rank of Brigadier General in 1974.

On 27 October 1991, Nido died in San Juan, Puerto Rico and was buried with full military honors in Plot: J 9 of the Puerto Rico National Cemetery in Bayamón, Puerto Rico.

== Awards and decorations ==
Among Nido's awards and decorations were the following:

1	Distinguished Flying Cross		Air Medal with four bronze oak leaf clusters
2	American Defense Service Medal	Air Force Presidential Unit Citation with one bronze oak leaf cluster	National Defense Service Medal
3	European-African-Middle Eastern Campaign Medal	American Campaign Medal	World War II Victory Medal

Badges:

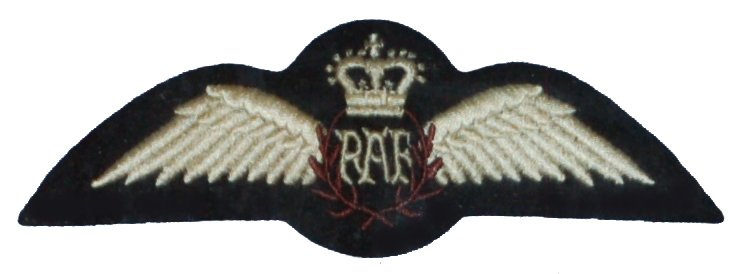
- RAF Pilot Wings
- U.S. Air Force Command Pilot badge

== Legacy ==
A main road at Muñiz Air National Guard Base is named after Brigadier General Alberto A. Nido.

In 2021 Alberto A. Nido was posthumously inducted into the Puerto Rico Veterans Hall of Fame.

== See also ==
- List of Puerto Ricans
- List of Puerto Rican military personnel
- Puerto Ricans in World War II
- Hispanics in the United States Air Force
- Puerto Rico Air National Guard
