= Orlando Llenza =

United States general (1930–2021)

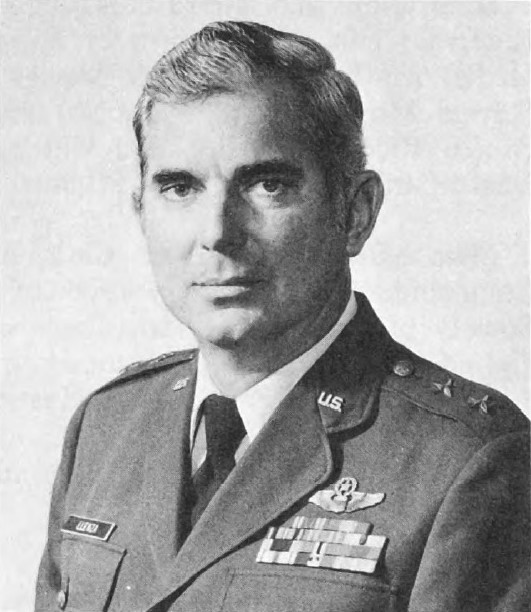
- Major General Orlando Llenza
- Born: July 1, 1930; Santurce, Puerto Rico
- Died: March 11, 2021 (aged 90); Miami, Florida
- Burial place: Puerto Rico National Cemetery in Bayamón, Puerto Rico
- Military career
- Allegiance: United States of America
- Branch: Air Force Reserve; 1946–1951; United States Air Force; 1951–1977; Puerto Rico Air National Guard
- Service years: 1977–1983
- Rank: Major General
- Units: 9th Air Refueling Squadron
- Commands: Adjutant General of the Puerto Rico National Guard
- Conflicts: Korean War
- Awards: Air Force Distinguished Service Medal

Major General Orlando Llenza (July 1, 1930 – March 11, 2021) was the second Puerto Rican to reach the rank of Major General (two-star General) in the United States Air Force. Llenza served as commander of the Puerto Rico Air National Guard (PRANG).

== Early years ==
Llenza was born to Maria Isabel Lopez and Harry B. Llenza in Santurce barrio in the municipality of San Juan, Puerto Rico the capital of Puerto Rico, where he received his primary and secondary education. In 1947, he graduated from Central High School in Santurce and applied for admission at Georgia Tech. In 1951 he earned his bachelor's degree in Architecture and a commission as 2nd lieutenant through the Air Force ROTC program.

== Military career ==
Llenza began his military career as an enlisted airman in the United States Air Force Reserve in 1946 and in 1951 joined the regular United States Air Force as a 2nd lieutenant assigned to Reese Air Force Base in Lubbock County, Texas. He attended USAF Undergraduate Pilot Training, the Air War College, and Air Command and Staff College in Maxwell Air Force Base, among others.

=== Korean War ===
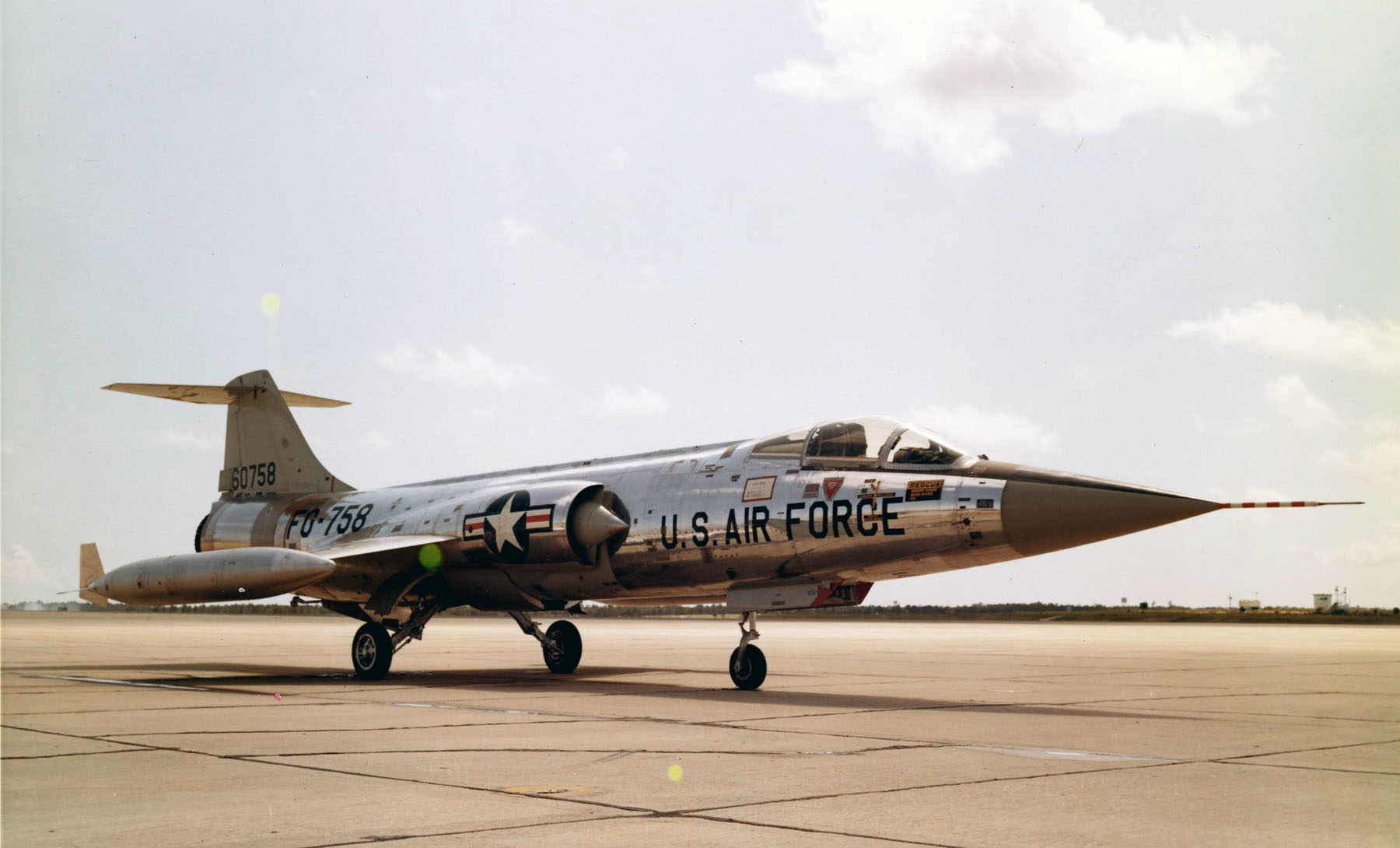
F-104 - Type of aircraft flown by Llenza

During the Korean War, Llenza flew as a pilot in the 9th Air Refueling Squadron at Davis–Monthan Air Force Base. During his career he flew the T-6 Texan, B-25 Mitchell, Boeing KB-29M tanker, KC-97 Stratofreighter tanker, T-33 Shooting Star Shooting Star, F-86 Sabre D, E, F and H models, F-104 Starfighter, and the C-47 Skytrain, C-54 Skymaster, C-131 Samaritan transports.

== Adjutant General of P.R. National Guard ==
After leaving active duty, Llenza joined the Puerto Rico Air National Guard. He fulfilled many roles within the 156th Wing Tactical Fighter Group at Muñiz Air National Guard Base including flight leader, squadron commander and group deputy commander for operations. In 1965 Llenza was part of the U.S. action in the Dominican Republic at the start of the Dominican Civil War. Llenza was named Adjutant General of the Puerto Rico National Guard by Governor Carlos Romero Barceló, a position which he held from 1977 to 1983. His promotion to major general in the Air Force Reserve was confirmed by the United States Senate on February 8, 1979. Llenza became the mission director in Ecuador for US AID from 1983 to 1986. As a civilian he was a successful architect with Llenza & Llenza (the other Llenza was Hector his brother).

Llenza was also the recipient of many awards, including the U.S. Distinguished Service Medal and the National Order of Merit-Ecuador. General Llenza was the Chairman of the American Veterans' Committee for Puerto Rico Self-Determination. Llenza was a member of the Board of Directors of the United States Council for Puerto Rico Statehood.

After retiring from the Air National Guard, Llenza worked for the United States Agency for International Development as the mission director in Quito, Ecuador, for three years.

== Death ==
Llenza died on March 11, 2021, in Miami, Florida, and was buried at the Puerto Rico National Cemetery in Bayamón, Puerto Rico.

== Awards and decorations ==
Among Llenza's decorations and medals were the following:

Command Air Force Pilot Badge

Air Force Distinguished Service Medal
Meritorious Service Medal
Air Medal
Air Force Commendation Medal
Air Force Achievement Medal
Air Force Presidential Unit Citation
Combat Readiness Medal
Air Force Good Conduct Medal (with one Oak leaf cluster)
Armed Forces Reserve Medal (with Bronze Hourglass Device)
National Defense Service Medal
Korean Service Medal (with two Service stars)
Armed Forces Expeditionary Medal
Air Force Overseas Long Tour Service Ribbon
Air Force Longevity Service Award
Small Arms Expert Marksmanship Ribbon
Air Force Training Ribbon
Republic of Korea Presidential Unit Citation
United Nations Korea Medal
Florida Distinguished Service Medal
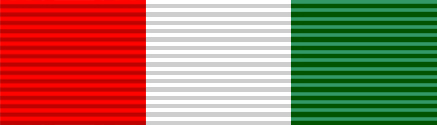
Puerto Rico Service Medal with two bronce Oak leaf cluster
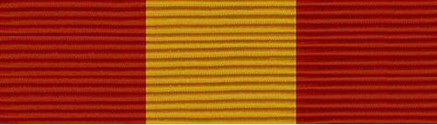
Puerto Rico Medal for Distinguished Service
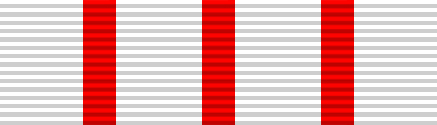
Puerto Rico Civil Disturbance Ribbon

Foreign award

National Order of Merit-Ecuador

== See also ==
- List of Puerto Ricans
- List of Puerto Rican military personnel
- Hispanics in the United States Air Force

Military offices
Preceded by Major General Salvador M. Padilla Escabi	Adjutant General of the Puerto Rico National Guard; Under Governor Carlos Romero Barceló; 1977–1983	Succeeded by Brigadier General Luis González Vales
