= Mihiel Gilormini =

United States Air Force general

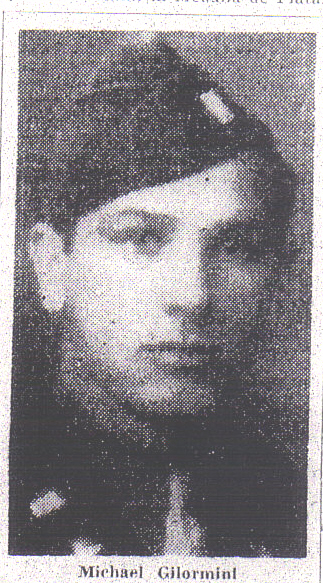
- Mihiel "Mike" Gilormini (1944); Gilormini was a co-founder of the Puerto Rico Air National Guard
- Born: August 3, 1918; Yauco, Puerto Rico
- Died: January 29, 1988 (aged 69); San Juan, Puerto Rico
- Burial place: Puerto Rico National Cemetery in Bayamón, Puerto Rico
- Military career
- Allegiance: United States of America (also British Commonwealth)
- Branch: Royal Canadian Air Force (1941), Royal Air Force (1941–1942); United States Army Air Forces (1942–1947), United States Air Force (1947); Puerto Rico Air National Guard (1947–1975)
- Service years: 1941–1975
- Rank: Brigadier General
- Nickname: "Mike"
- Commands: 198th Tactical Fighter Squadron; Puerto Rico Air National Guard
- Conflicts: World War II
- Awards: Silver Star; Distinguished Flying Cross (5 times); Purple Heart; Air Medal with four clusters

Brigadier General Mihiel "Mike" Gilormini Pacheco (August 3, 1918 – January 29, 1988) was a United States Air Force officer who served in the Royal Air Force and in the United States Army Air Forces during World War II. He was the recipient of the Silver Star, the Air Medal with four clusters and the Distinguished Flying Cross 5 times. He was also a co-founder of the Puerto Rico Air National Guard.

== Early years ==
Gilormini (birth name: Mihiel Gilormini Pacheco) was born to Corsican descent Domingo Gilormini and Petronila Pacheco de Gilormini in the town of Yauco, Puerto Rico. The town of Yauco, where he was raised and where he received his primary education, is located in the southwestern region of the island. Gilormini, graduated from the Escuela Superior de Yauco (Yauco High School) and in the early 1940s, moved to San Diego, California where he took private flying lessons, earning his pilot's license in 1941. On November 23, 1941, he enlisted in the Royal Canadian Air Force with the rank of sergeant pilot.

== World War II ==
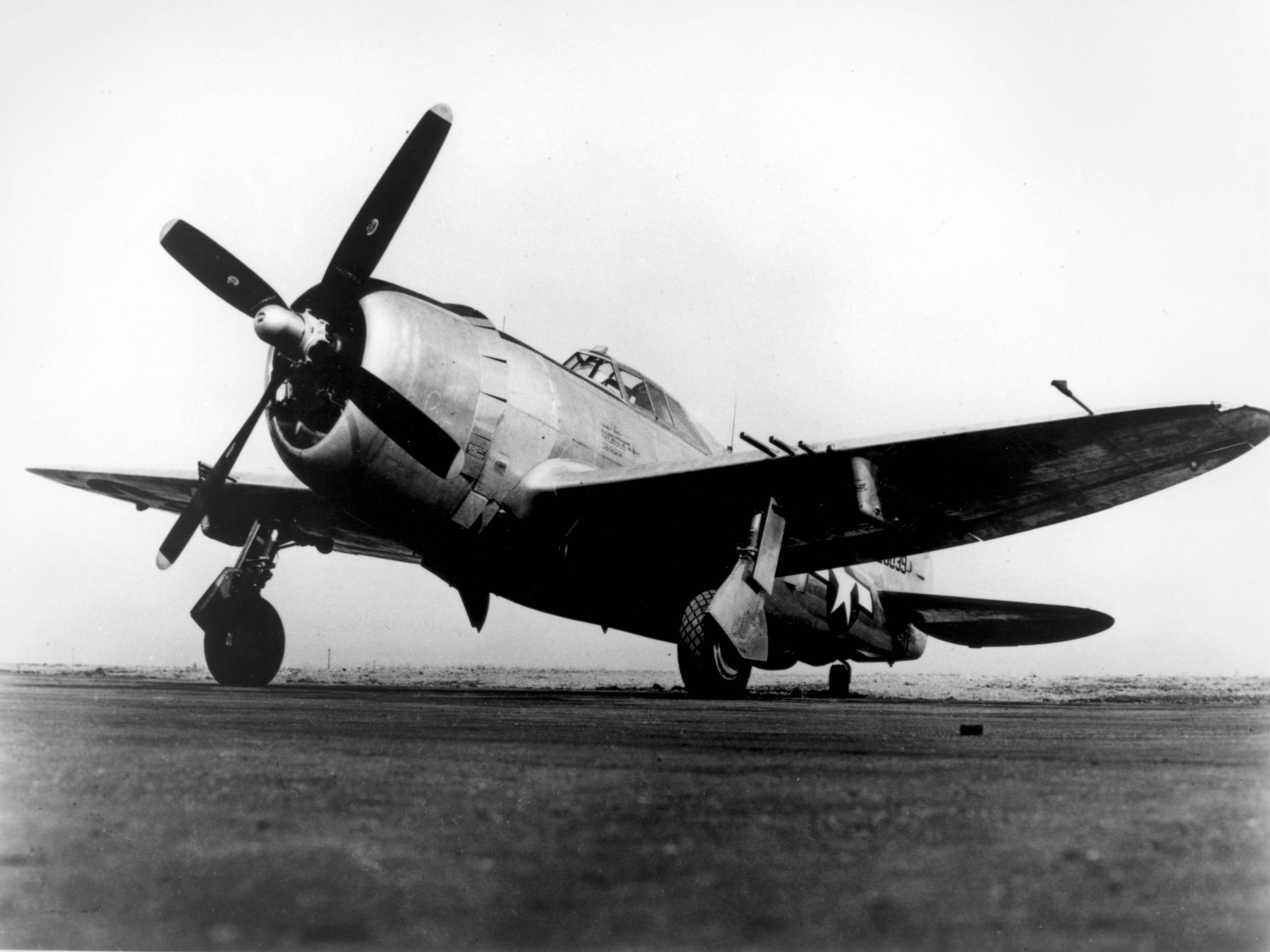
Gilormini flew a P-47 Thunderbolt similar to this

Upon the outbreak of World War II, Gilormini offered his services to the Royal Air Force and served with them. As a member of the RAF, he flew in a squadron of P-39s from England to North Africa and participated in the Allied invasion of Oran. He served with the RAF until November 30, 1942, when he joined the United States Army Air Forces with the rank of second lieutenant. In October 1942, he was assigned to the 346th Fighter Squadron and flew the Bell P-39 Airacobra interceptor. In March 1943, he was transferred to the 345th Fighter Squadron of the 350th Fighter Group in North Africa and Italy, to replace pilot losses. He stayed with the 345th "Devil Hawks" and flew a Republic P-47 Thunderbolt until February 1945. On one occasion Gilormini led a squadron in an attack against Nazi positions in Conneto, Italy. During the attack his P-47 was struck by enemy anti-aircraft fire. Gilormini made a nose dive which put out the flames consuming his aircraft and rejoined his squadron. His squadron destroyed a strategic railroad and vehicles which were transporting military equipment.

During the war he was promoted to captain and flew a total of 200 combat missions over England, North Africa, Corsica and Italy. On May 19, 1943, Gilormini was involved in an aircraft accident when his P-39 went down over Maison Blanche, Algiers.

In an interview, Colonel Earl Miller, a former buddy and roommate of Gilormini, recalled the following:

Gilormini was the commander of 'A' Flight while I was commander of 'C' Flight. We sometimes flew together. In fact, our last combat mission was attacking the airfield at Milano. I led the attack. The flak was real heavy. The 88 shells were bursting all around and also hitting a high bank (we were flying real low) to my right. Mike said, 'Dutch, you better bail out, you are on fire!' Followed immediately with, 'Don't bail out, it's another guy.' Unfortunately, my wingman crashed and was killed."

In 1945, Gilormini was awarded the Silver Star, G.O. (General Order) #27, for "Conspicuous Gallantry in Action" for his actions during the Conneto, Italy mission, while assigned to HQ, 12th Air Force . Gilormini and Miller flew their last flight in Italy together giving air cover for General George C. Marshall's visit to their group at Pisa. They both returned to the United States on the same ship. Gilormini was also the recipient of five Distinguished Flying Crosses. The Distinguished Flying Cross is a medal awarded to any officer or enlisted member of the United States armed forces who distinguishes himself or herself in combat in support of operations by "heroism" or extraordinary achievement while participating in an aerial flight. Also, in 1945, Puerto Rican poet Francisco Rojas Tollinchi paid homage to Gilormini in his poem "Recuerdo yaucano" (Remembrance of a Yaucano).

== Post World War II ==
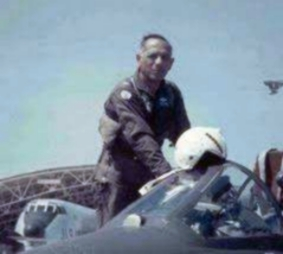
Brigadier General Mihiel Gilormini

After the war he continued to serve in the Army Air Force. In 1947, he was reassigned to the newly formed United States Air Force and named base commander to the 198th Fighter Squadron in Puerto Rico. On November 23, 1947, the Puerto Rico Air National Guard came into existence as a result of the efforts led by Colonel Mihiel Gilormini, Colonel Alberto A. Nido and Lieutenant Colonel José Antonio Muñiz. Gilormini was promoted to brigadier general and served as commander until his retirement from the military in 1975.

On January 29, 1988, Brigadier General Mihiel "Mike" Gilormini died in San Juan, Puerto Rico, and was buried with full military honors in Puerto Rico National Cemetery located in Bayamón, Puerto Rico.

In 2020 Mihiel "Mike" Gilormini was posthumously inducted to the Puerto Rico Veterans Hall of Fame.

== Awards and decorations ==
Among Gilormini's awards and decorations were the following:

Awards:

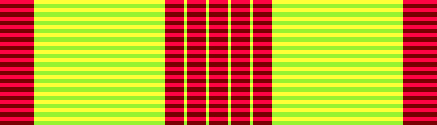
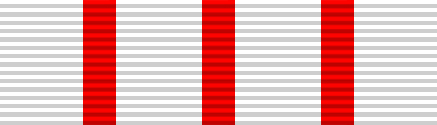
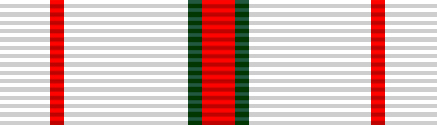
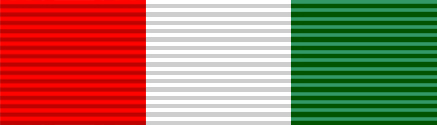
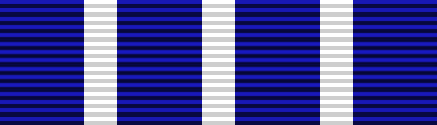
Silver Star
Distinguished Flying Cross with four oak leaf clusters
Purple Heart
Air Medal with four oak leaf clusters
American Campaign Medal
European-African-Middle East Campaign Medal
World War II Victory Medal
National Defense Service Medal
Air Force Longevity Service Award
Armed Forces Reserve Medal with silver Hourglass device
Small Arms Expert Marksmanship Ribbon
Air Force Presidential Unit Citation
Puerto Rico Commendation Medal
Puerto Rico Civil Disturbance Ribbon
Puerto Rico Disaster Relief Ribbon
Puerto Rico Service Medal with two oak leaf clusters
Puerto Rico Caribbean Emergency Ribbon

Badges:

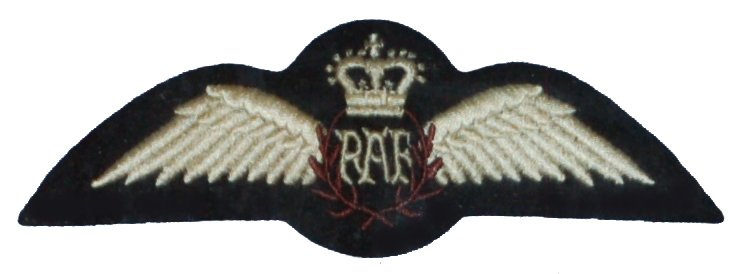
- RAF Pilot Wings
- WW II Army Air Force Pilot Badge

== See also ==
- List of Puerto Ricans
- List of Puerto Rican military personnel
- Puerto Ricans in World War II
- Corsican immigration to Puerto Rico
- Hispanics in the United States Air Force
- Puerto Rico Air National Guard
