= Puerto Rico Air National Guard =

Air force militia

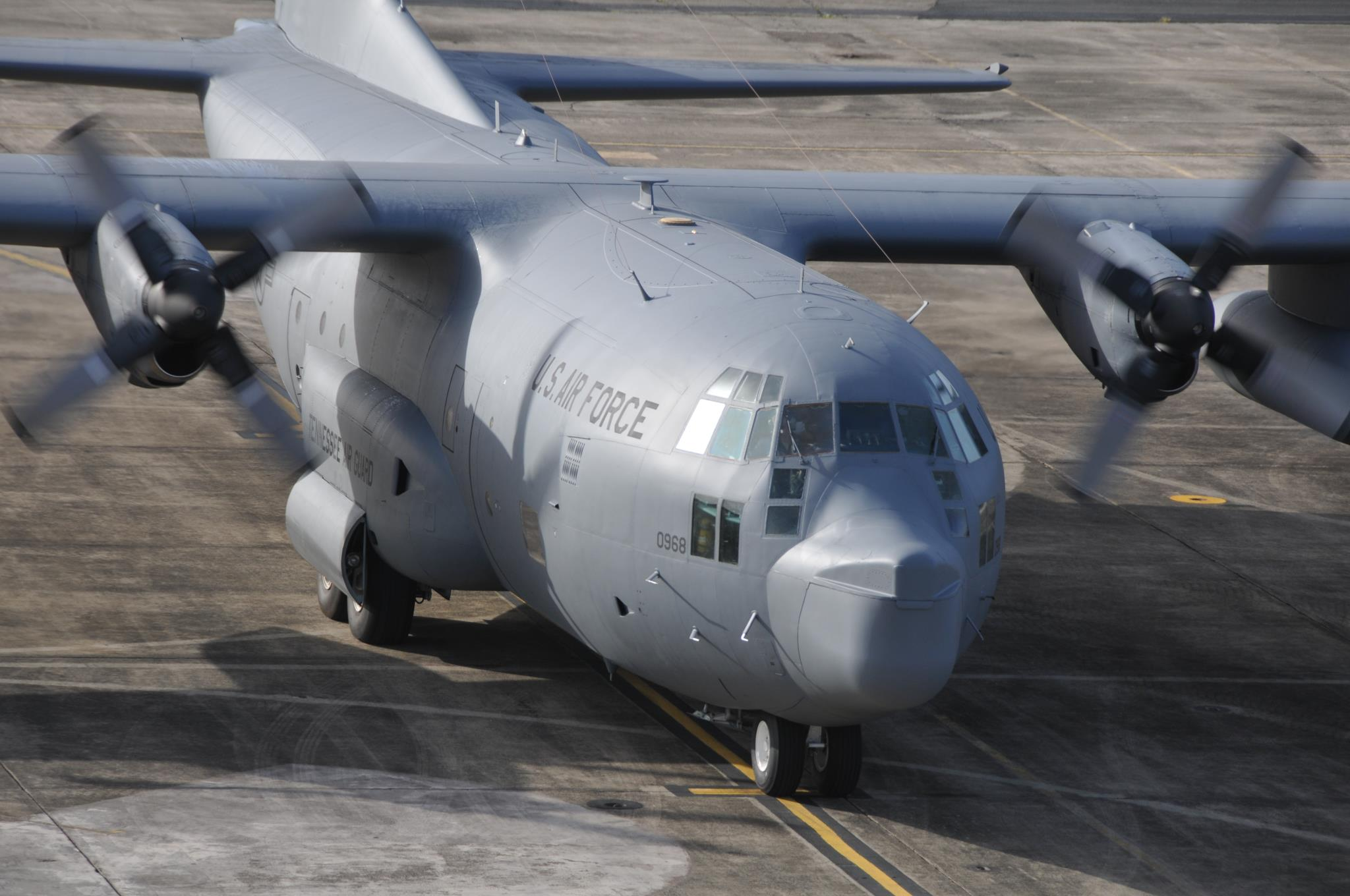
- A Lockheed WC-130H of the 198th Airlift Squadron at Muniz ANGB, San Juan. The 198th is the oldest unit in the Puerto Rico Air National Guard, having over 67 years of service.
- Active: 23 November 1947 - present
- Country: United States
- Allegiance: Puerto Rico
- Branch: Air National Guard
- Type: State militia, military reserve force
- Role: "To meet Commonwealth and federal mission responsibilities."
- Size: 1,200 airmen (Note: Vicens (2012; in Spanish) "... la Guardia Nacional cuenta con aproximadamente 7,200 soldados en la rama del ejército, 1,200 en la fuerza aérea, para un total de 8,400 ciudadanos-soldados y aviadores federales y 368 empleados civiles en apoyo a la fuerza militar federal ...")
- Part of: National Guard; Puerto Rico National Guard
- Garrison/HQ: Puerto Rico Air National Guard, Muñiz Air National Guard Base, 200 José A. (Tony) Santana Ave. Carolina, Puerto Rico 00979-1502

Commanders
- Federal Commander: President Donald Trump
- Commander-in-Chief: Governor Jenniffer González-Colón
- Adjutant General: MG Miguel A. Méndez, USA
- Air National Guard Commander: Brig Gen Humberto "Tillo" Pabon, USAF

Insignia
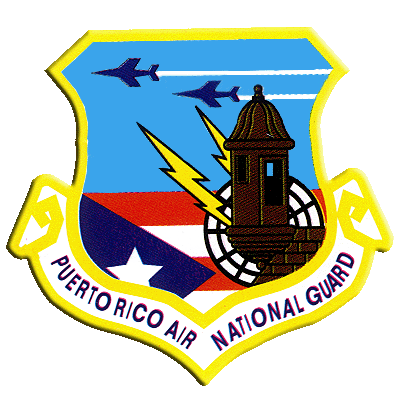
- Emblem of the Puerto Rico Air National Guard

Aircraft flown
- Transport: WC-130H Hercules

The Puerto Rico Air National Guard (PR ANG)—Spanish: Guardia Nacional Aérea de Puerto Rico—is the aerial militia of the Commonwealth of Puerto Rico, an unincorporated territory of the United States of America. It is, along with the Puerto Rico Army National Guard and the Puerto Rico State Guard, an element of the Puerto Rico National Guard. After beginning as four units, the PRANG expanded to 11 units by the 1980s, including the 1956th Tactics Combat Group, the 140th Radar Squadron, and others.

As commonwealth militia units, the units in the Puerto Rico Air National Guard are not in the normal United States Air Force chain of command. They are under the jurisdiction of the governor of Puerto Rico, though the office of the Puerto Rico Adjutant General, unless they are federalized by order of the president of the United States. The Puerto Rico Air National Guard is headquartered at San Juan, Puerto Rico, and commanded by Brigadier General Travis Acheson.

== Overview ==
Under the "Total Force" concept, Puerto Rico Air National Guard units are considered to be Air Reserve Components (ARC) of the United States Air Force (USAF). Puerto Rico ANG units are trained and equipped by the Air Force and are operationally gained by a major command of the USAF if federalized. In addition, the Puerto Rico Air National Guard forces are assigned to Air Expeditionary Forces and are subject to deployment tasking orders along with their active duty and Air Force Reserve counterparts in their assigned cycle deployment window.

Along with their federal reserve obligations, as commonwealth militia units the elements of the Puerto Rico ANG are subject to being activated by order of the governor to provide protection of life and property, and preserve peace, order and public safety. Commonwealth missions include disaster relief in times of earthquakes, hurricanes, floods and forest fires, search and rescue, protection of vital public services, and support to civil defense.

== Components ==
The Puerto Rico Air National Guard consists of the following major unit:

- 156th Wing

Established 23 November 1947 (as: 198th Fighter Squadron)
Stationed at: Muñiz Air National Guard Base, Carolina, Puerto Rico
Gained by: Air Mobility Command

Support Unit Functions and Capabilities:

- 141st Air Control Squadron. - Punta Borinquen Radar Station - Aguadilla, Puerto Rico (former Ramey AFB)

During exercises, contingencies, or actual war, the 141st Air Control Squadron's Command and Control mission is to provide meteorological support and deploy with, advise, and assist the ground force commander in planning, requesting, coordinating and controlling close air support, tactical air reconnaissance, and tactical airlift.

- 140th Air Defense Squadron. - Fixed Radar Unit, Punta Salinas Air National Guard Station - Toa Baja, Puerto Rico

The mission of the 140th Air Defense Squadron involves work with a variety of satellites and systems to provide individuals in the field with real-time space situational awareness.

== History ==
The Puerto Rico Air National Guard came into existence as a result of the efforts led by Colonel Mihiel Gilormini also known as "El Gallo de Yauco", Colonel Alberto A. Nido and Lieutenant Colonel José Antonio Muñiz. On 26 October 1947, several officers were sworn as members of the nascent PRANG. On 23 November 1947, 18 officials and 33 national guardsmen were organized as a unit under Cpt. Nido. The unit was assigned to the Isla Grande Airport and received its first combat aircraft of the Republic P-47 Thunderbolt model and Douglas B-18 Bolo model. The new PRANG was subdivided into four units. The entity was also assigned the 156th Tactical Combat Group, a medical unit. In November 1950, the 198th was activated during the Jayuya Uprising, remaining in action for 11 days, conducting aerial assaults on U.S. citizens in the municipalities of Utuado and Jayuya, as well as conducting reconnaissance and transporting supplies.

In 1954 the PRANG received its first T-33 planes and the following year it received F-86 jets. Aboard these jets, several members of the 198th's Flying Buccaneers broke the sound barrier, including Col. Alberto Nido, Com. Mihiel Gilormini, First Lt. Peter Kryzanowski and Second Lt. José Bloise. The squadron also became distinguished since several of its members were bilingual, a novelty during these days. In a subsequent inspection of Ramey, a group of eleven generals led by Gen. George Finch of the 14th Air Force, noted the progress of the 198th in five years. Sgt. Eugenio Betancourt and Sgt. Rafael Altieri were decorated during this visit, receiving medals donated by the Legislature of Puerto Rico for outstanding service during the year. In 1956, it was relocated at the Isla Verde Airport.

After serving during the Korean War, José Muñiz was placed in charge of the 198th Combat Squadron, a function that he performed until his death on 5 July 1960. During this year, the PRANG was activated to provide assistance to the government during a series of floods that affected the east coast of Puerto Rico. During the Cuban Missile Crisis, all pilots were placed on alert and waiting for orders while the crisis was solved in the adjacent island. In 1963, the PRANG participated in the search for Mercury Astronaut Scott Carpenter following his first orbital flight, which the 140th Radar Squadron accomplished under Col. Fred Brown. The following year, personnel and supplies were sent to the Dominican Republic in response to the Dominican Civil War.

Beginning in 1964, the unit was assigned the tactical combat and surveillance of the Puerto Rico air space. The 198th Tactical Combat Squadron was placed under Commander Jan Johnson, receiving F-86E, F-86D, F-86H and F-104 models in 1967. This same year, its home base was renamed after Lt. Col. José Muñiz and the PRANG also trained personnel for three groups IOC the Venezuelan Air Force. The entity recruited poor children, hosting a camp for that population in 1970. That same year, the 156th was given an award as the most prominent medical unit in all of the USNG system.

One of P-47 Thunderbolts was restored for flight in 1972. Towards the year's end, the PRANG was sent with supplies for the victims of the 1972 Nicaragua earthquake. In 1974, the unit was sent to Honduras following the passing of Hurricane Fifi. The following year, the PRANG was sent to respond to the 1976 Guatemala earthquake. In 1976, the 198th received an A-7D Corsair. In 1976, the unit's double task was modified. By 1977, the same year that the PRANG celebrated its 30th anniversary, the 140th Radar Squadron was operating additional detachments at Ramey Air Force Base.

Gilormini was promoted to brigadier general and served as commander until his retirement in 1975. Colonel Nido was promoted to brigadier general and served at National Guard Headquarters as Chief of Staff for Air. Brigadier General Jose M. Portela, the youngest C-141 Starlifter aircraft commander and captain, the only reservist ever to serve as director of mobility forces for Bosnia, served as commander of the Puerto Rico Air National Guard from 11 January 2005 to November 2006.

The tactical aviation element of PRANG operates as the 156th Airlift Wing, 198th Airlift Squadron, flying C-130E aircraft. They operate out of Muñiz Air National Guard Base, located within the grounds of Luis Muñoz Marín International Airport. In the past, they have operated P-47 Thunderbolts, C-47 Skytrains, C-45, T-6 Texan, B-26 Invader, L-5 Sentinel, T-33 Shooting Star, F-86D, F-86E, and F-86H Sabre Jets, F-104 Starfighters, C-54, T-29, C-131, U-3, O-2, A-7D Corsair II, F-16 Fighting Falcons, C-26, and C-130 Hercules type aircraft. Phasing out the F-16s left Puerto Rico with no air-to-air defense assets.

In August 2016, the 156th was recognized.

In 2019 in the wake of a WC-130H crash that took the lives of all nine airman the National Guard Bureau took the flying mission from the 156th Airlift Wing redesignating it the 156th Wing leaving it with no assigned aircraft.

== Muñiz Air National Guard Base ==
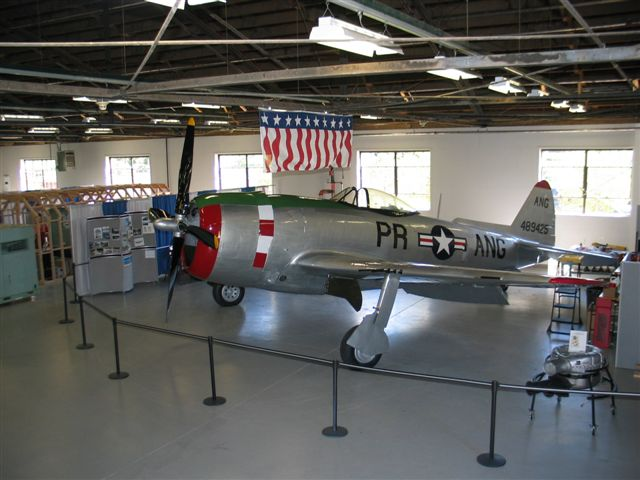
Muñiz's PRANG P-47 on display at the Peterson Air & Space Museum, Colorado

Muñiz Air National Guard Base or "Base Muñiz" in Carolina, Puerto Rico was formally named in 1963 to honor of one of the initial members of the unit who was killed in the line of duty. Lieutenant Colonel José Antonio Muñiz (full name: José Antonio Muñiz Vázquez) was lost on 4 July 1960 when his F-86D lost power on climbout for a formation fly-by. Major General Orlando Llenza, then a fellow aviator in the unit, later described the loss in the following translation:

We were short one pilot and Joe offered to stand in. I was formation lead. Right after departing the runway, his afterburner nozzles failed open, indicating a loss of power. The ejection seats in use at the time could not safely extract a pilot at low altitude and Joe went in little after takeoff. No one in the flight mentioned the event; we executed the flyover and were notified of the loss upon our return to base. Shortly after that, we received the F-86H which did not use afterburning and could fly non-stop from Homestead AFB (in Florida) to San Juan unlike the previous D and E models, which had to stop for fuel at Guantanamo, Cuba. .

Muñiz ANGB is the home of the Puerto Rico Air National Guard's 156th Airlift Wing and the 198th Airlift Squadron.

== 2018 U.S. Air National Guard WC-130H crash ==
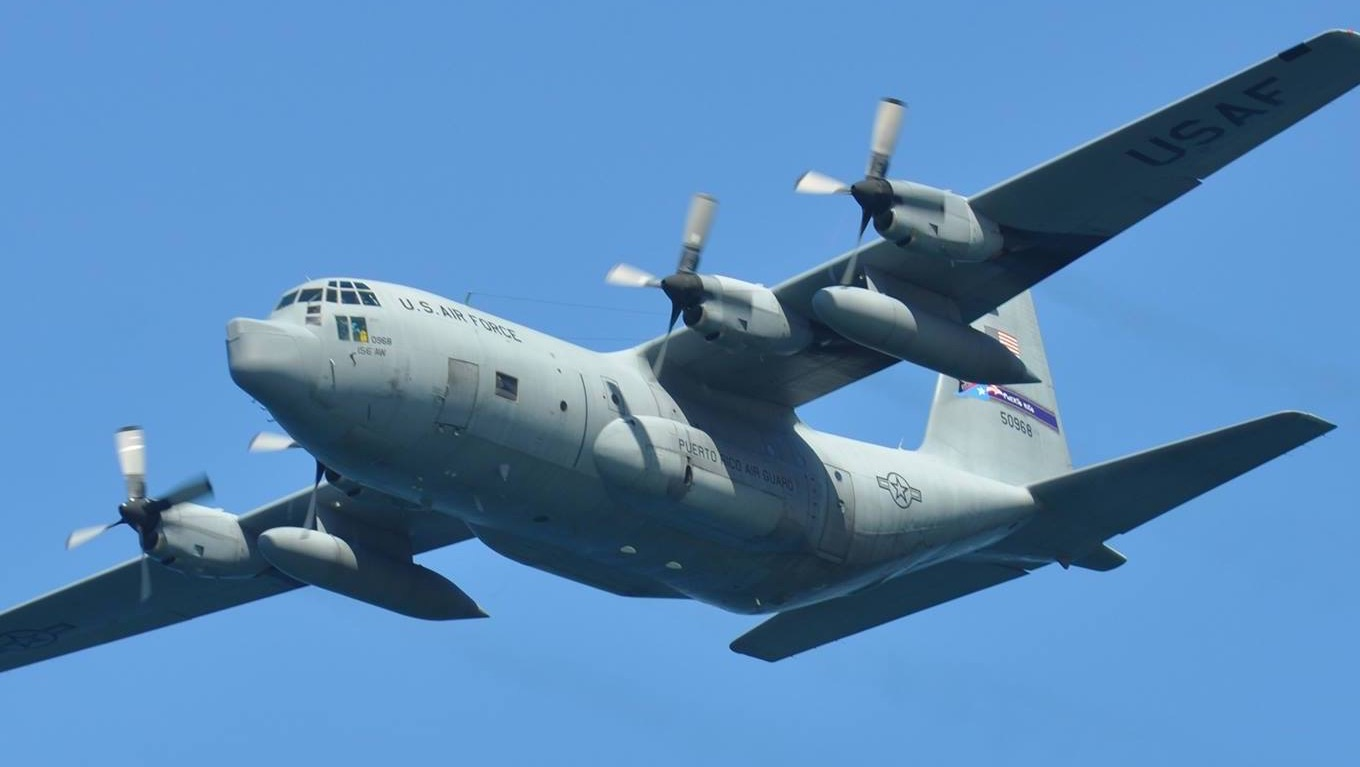
65-0968, the aircraft involved in the crash, photographed in November 2016

On 2 May 2018, a Lockheed WC-130H weather reconnaissance aircraft of the Puerto Rico Air National Guard crashed in the US state of Georgia, shortly after departing from Savannah Air National Guard Base (which is located at Savannah/Hilton Head International Airport). All nine airmen (five crewmen and four passengers) were killed in the accident.

=== Aircraft ===
The aircraft was a Lockheed C-130H Hercules more than fifty years old, with tail number 65-0968 and serial number 4110, that had been converted to a WC-130H for weather reconnaissance operations, but which had its weather reconnaissance equipment subsequently removed. It was reassigned from the 403rd Wing of the Air Force Reserve Command to the Air National Guard to be operated by the 156th Airlift Wing of the Puerto Rico Air National Guard.

== 1981 Muñiz Air National Guard Base attack ==
1981 Muñiz Air National Guard Base attack
- Part of Los Macheteros insurgency
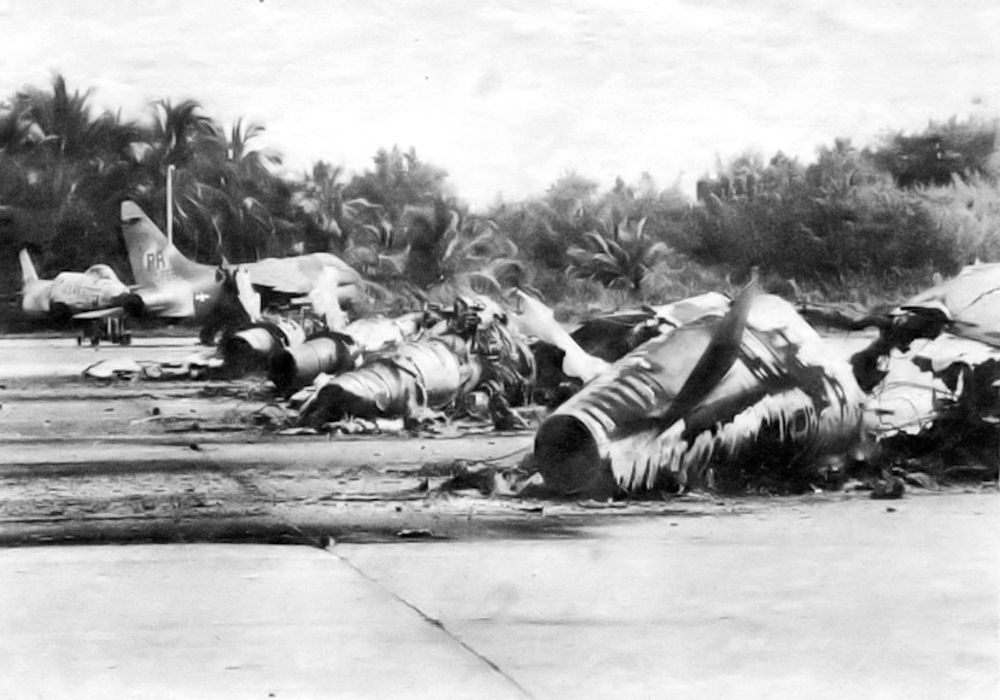
- Destroyed A-7D aircraft of the Puerto Rico Air National Guard at Muñiz Air National Guard Base, 12 January 1981
- Type: Bombing
- Location: San Juan, Puerto Rico
- Target: Muñiz Air National Guard Base
- Date: 12 January 1981
- Executed by: Boricua Popular Army

On 12 January 1981, the Boricua Popular Army (Ejército Popular Boricua), a Puerto Rican separatist organization, carried out multiple bombings at the Muñiz Air National Guard Base. At the time, it was the largest attack on U.S. military forces since the Vietnam War. The attack was timed to coincide with the birthday of the Puerto Rican independence advocate Eugenio María de Hostos. The attack caused approximately $45,000,000 in damages to ten A-7D aircraft and a single F-104. It was carried out by eleven commandos of the Popular Army of Puerto Rico, also known as "The Macheteros." The base was home to eighteen A-7D and one F-104 aircraft.

Eleven saboteurs, disguised in military uniforms, penetrated the security fence and infiltrated the A-7 parking ramp through a hole cut in the perimeter chain link fence. Investigators believe that some, if not all, arrived near the ramp in a boat guided along a nearby channel. The operation occurred during a shift change of the base security, which was provided by both contracted civilian guards and uniformed Air National Guard Security Forces. The perpetrators exited the area the same way they came in, using the entry point as the exit point. Choosing to strike at shift change indicates the possibility of prior surveillance or insider information. The commandos placed approximately 25 explosive devices on the aircraft.

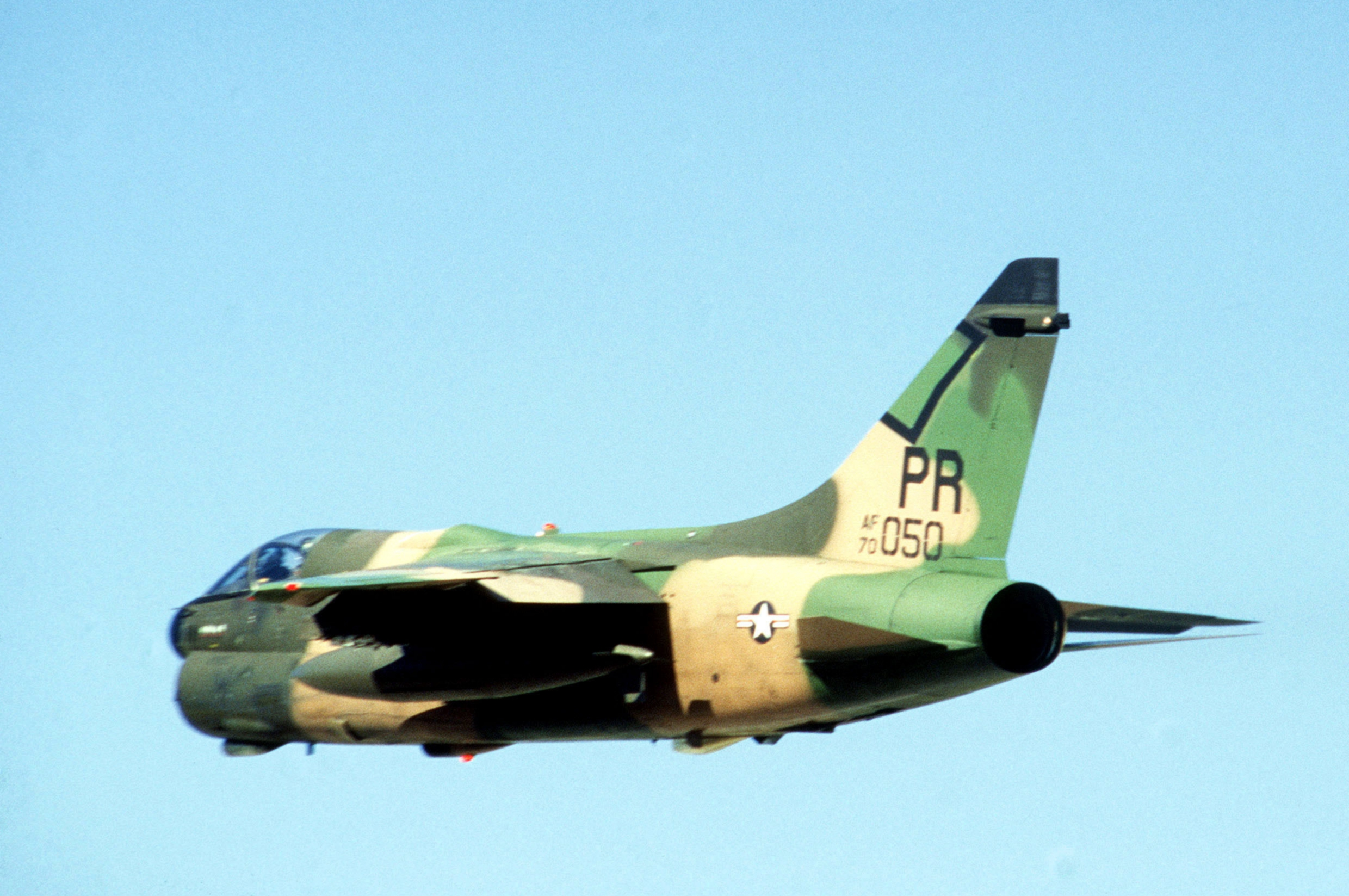
An A-7D Corsair II of the 198th Tactical Fighter Squadron, 156th Tactical Fighter Group in flight prior to 12 January 1981 attack. This was one of the destroyed aircraft.

The planes were destroyed using individual satchels containing four sticks of Iremite (an emulsion explosive) with detonators and incendiary charges. They were time-delayed using a simple watch and battery combination.

The explosives were stolen from a Puerto Rican explosives factory, with the theft traced back to the Boricua Popular Army. The AFOSI (United States Air Force Office of Special Investigations) called the explosives "sophisticated". It was estimated that the entire operation took less than eight minutes to complete. Officials expressed concern as to how a group of semiskilled intruders were able to inflict severe damage to mission capability.

Press coverage was substantial at the time of the incident, but died down quickly. This was the first peacetime incident in which USAF aircraft were destroyed by a domestic act, and the first time separatists had attacked a USAF installation. It was the greatest material loss from any single attack perpetrated against the USAF anywhere in the world. The National Guard Bureau (NGB) was aware of the shortfalls in security at Muñiz ANG Base, and of the threat, yet corrective actions had not been implemented at the time. The bombings resulted in the implementation of more strict security protocols and systems around the perimeter of the base. It was also determined that an increase in security personnel was in order raising the number to 22 guards, up from 11, funded entirely by the federal government, as well as electric devices added to the fence.

Destroyed aircraft were A-7D AF Serial Numbers 72-0189; 72-0219; 72-0221; 72-0222; 73-0994; 73-1050; 74-1748, and 74-1755. The sole F-104C, of a Mission Design Series previously flown by the PRANG, was a non-flyable aircraft destined to be a permanent memorial static display.

== See also ==
- 156th Wing
- Military history of Puerto Rico
- Puerto Rico Adjutant General
- Puerto Rico Wing Civil Air Patrol
