= 198th Airlift Squadron =

Former flying squadron of the Puerto Rico Air National Guard 156th Airlift Wing

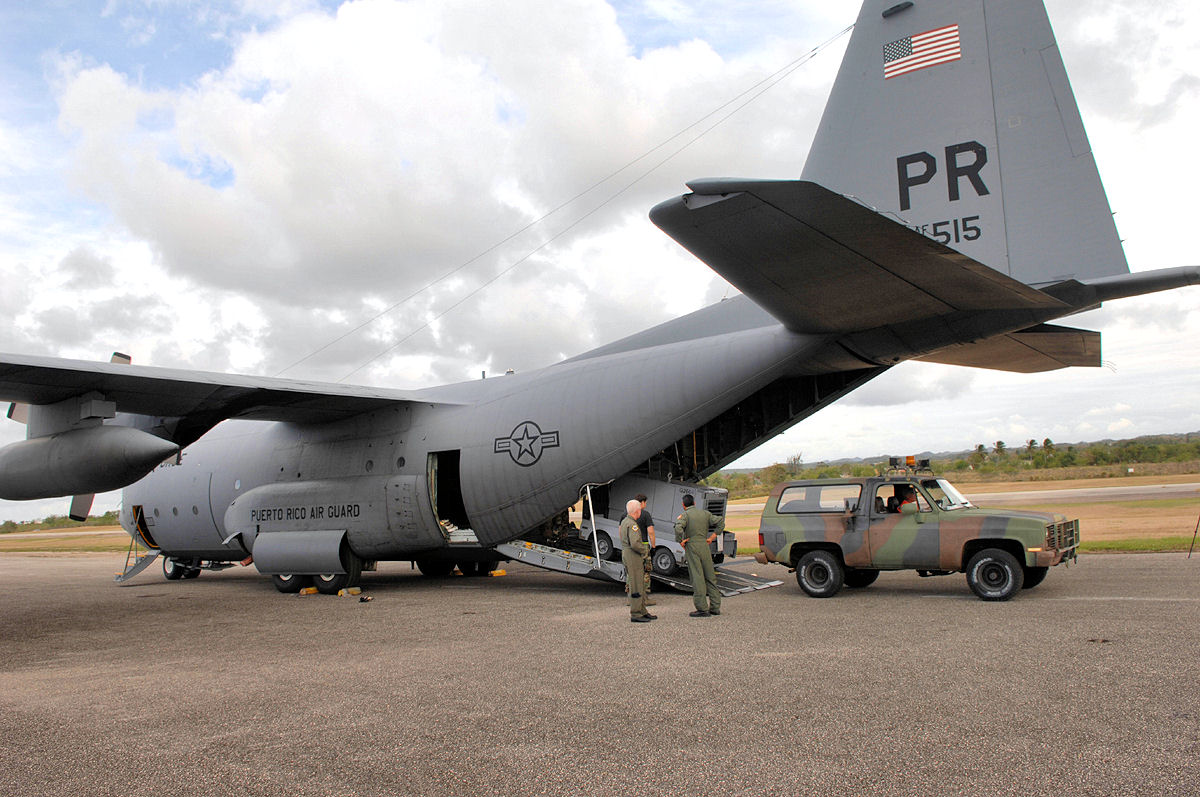
- Lockheed C-130E-LM Hercules 64-0515 from the 198th Airlift Squadron, 156th Airlift Wing, Puerto Rico Air National Guard (2009)
- Active: 1944–1946; 1947–2019
- Country: United States
- Type: Squadron
- Role: Airlift
- Nickname: Bucaneros

Insignia
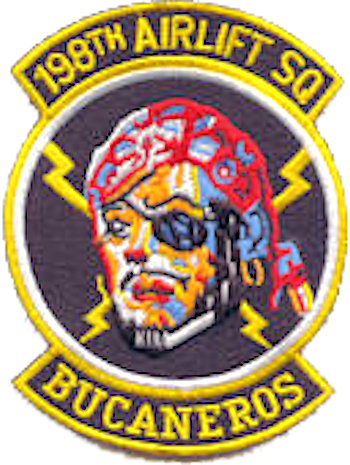
- Patceh with 198th Airlift Squadron emblem

The 198th Airlift Squadron was the last flying squadron of the Puerto Rico Air National Guard's 156th Airlift Wing located at Muñiz Air National Guard Base, in Carolina, Puerto Rico. The 198th last assigned aircraft was the WC-130H Hercules. The 198th was established in October 1944 as the 463d Fighter Squadron, was re-designated as the 198th and allotted to the PRANG in May 1946, redesignated from fighter to airlift in October 1998, and was inactivated on 31 December 2019.

== History ==
=== World War II ===
Established in late 1944 at Peterson Field, Colorado as the 463d Fighter Squadron. Trained under XXII Bomber Command as a Very Long Range P-47N Thunderbolt bomber escort squadron, programmed for B-29 Superfortress escort duty from Okinawa. For four months they received combat training for long-range escort, strafing, and dive-bombing. Training delayed due to P-47N aircraft non-availability, finally equipped in the late spring of 1945 with the long-distance fighters.

Deployed to Okinawa in June 1945 as part of the 507th Fighter Group and prepared for the invasion of Japan along with the 413th and 414th Fighter Groups, all equipped with P-47N. On 1 July 1945 it began flying airstrikes from Ie Shima, targeting enemy ships, railroad bridges, airfields, factories, and barracks in Japan, Korea, and China. On 8 August 1945 the group escorted B-29 bombers on a raid, shooting down several Japanese fighters.

The squadron flew some long distance fighter-bomber sweeps over Japanese Home Islands 1 July 1945 – 14 August 1945 but never performed operational B-29 escort missions due to the end of the war in August.

Remained in Okinawa until inactivated in May 1946.

=== Puerto Rico Air National Guard ===
The 463d was redesignated the 198th Fighter Squadron and was allotted to the National Guard on 24 May 1946. It was organized at Isla Grande Airport, San Juan, Puerto Rico, and was extended federal recognition on 23 November 1947. The squadron was equipped with F-47N Thunderbolts and was assigned to the Puerto Rico National Guard, operationally gained by Fourteenth Air Force, Air Defense Command.

==== Air Defense mission ====
The mission of the 198th Fighter Squadron was the air defense of Puerto Rico. The short runways of Isla Grande Airport at the time did not allow safe jet operations. The squadron was forced to move its aircraft to the runways at the still under-construction San Juan International Airport maintaining the rest of its organization at Isla Grande Airport. The 198th was upgraded to North American F-86D Sabre interceptors.

==== Tactical Fighter mission ====
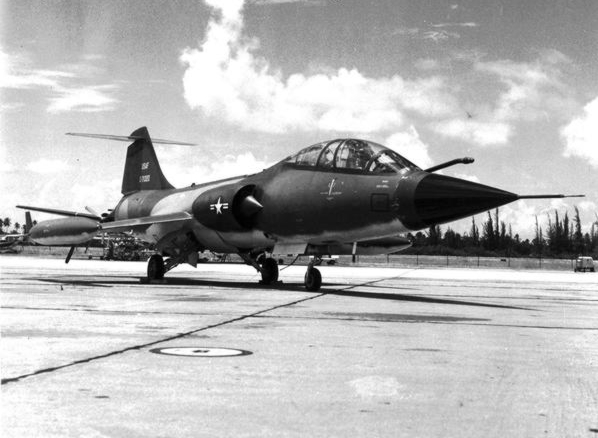
F-104D Starfighter of the 198th Tactical Fighter Squadron.

On 15 October 1962, the Puerto Rico Air National Guard was expanded to a group status, and the 156th Tactical Fighter Group was recognized and activated by the National Guard Bureau. The 156th was transferred to Tactical Air Command, with the 198th becoming at Tactical Fighter Squadron and assigned to the 156th Group. Other elements assigned into the group were the 156th headquarters, 156th Material Squadron (Maintenance and Supply), 156th Combat Support Squadron, and the 156th USAF Dispensary. With the transfer to a tactical fighter role, the 198th received F-86H Sabre tactical fighters.

In 1967, F-104C Starfighers (and an F-104D two-seat trainer) were assigned to the 156th, upgrading the group to Mach-2 supersonic tactical fighter-bombers, replacing the elderly F-86H Sabre fighter-bombers. The F-104C was equipped to carry bombs or rocket pods on under-wing and fuselage points. The upward-firing Lockheed C-2 rocket-boosted ejector seat was standard. The internal 20-mm rotary cannon of the F-104A was retained, as well as the ability to carry an AIM-9 Sidewinder air-to-air missile on each wingtip to fill an air defense interceptor mission.

In 1975, the F-104s were retired, the 198th being the last USAF unit to fly the Starfighters. They were replaced by A-7D Corsair II ground support aircraft. Although designed primarily as a ground attack aircraft, it also had limited air-to-air combat capability.

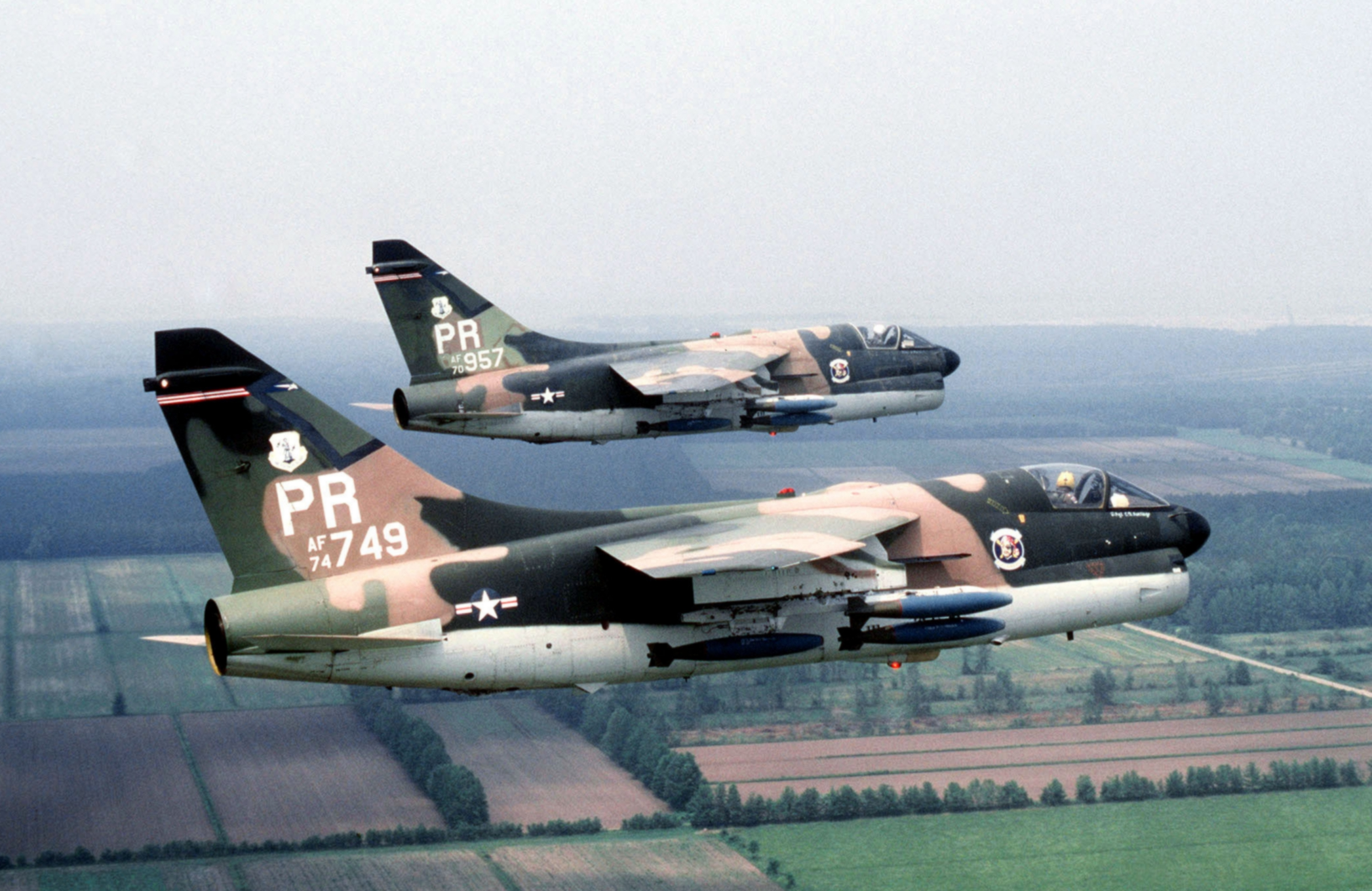
A-7D Corsair II aircraft (s/n 70-0957, 74–1749) assigned to the 198th Tactical Fighter Squadron during Exercise Solid Shield 78 on 1 May 1978

In the morning of 12 January 1981, a group of eleven commandos, seven guards and four explosive specialists, set explosives at Muñiz Air National Guard Base, located on the northeastern corner of the Luis Muñoz Marín International Airport in San Juan. The ensuing explosion destroyed nine aircraft (several operational A-7 Corsair II light attack aircraft and a single Lockheed F-104 Starfighter supersonic fighter-interceptor aircraft being retained for a static display) and two trucks and damaged two ships on loan from the U.S. Air Force, with the authors leaving a machete behind. The destruction of the military equipment ascended to $45–50 million.

The attack was the largest on an American Air Force Base since the Vietnam War. The hostage situation in Iran at the time overshadowed this incident in the news media. The eleven National Guard planes at Muñiz Air Base were alleged by socialist organizations to be destined for use against popular insurgents in El Salvador. These allegations were never proven and may have been self-serving.

In 1992 the A-7Ds were being retired, and they were replaced by Block 15 F-16A/B Fighting Falcons modified for Air Defense. The F-16 ADF was a standard block 15 model converted to air defense fighters for the Air National Guard, and would take over the fighter interception mission, providing the primary defense of North America against bombers and cruise missiles.

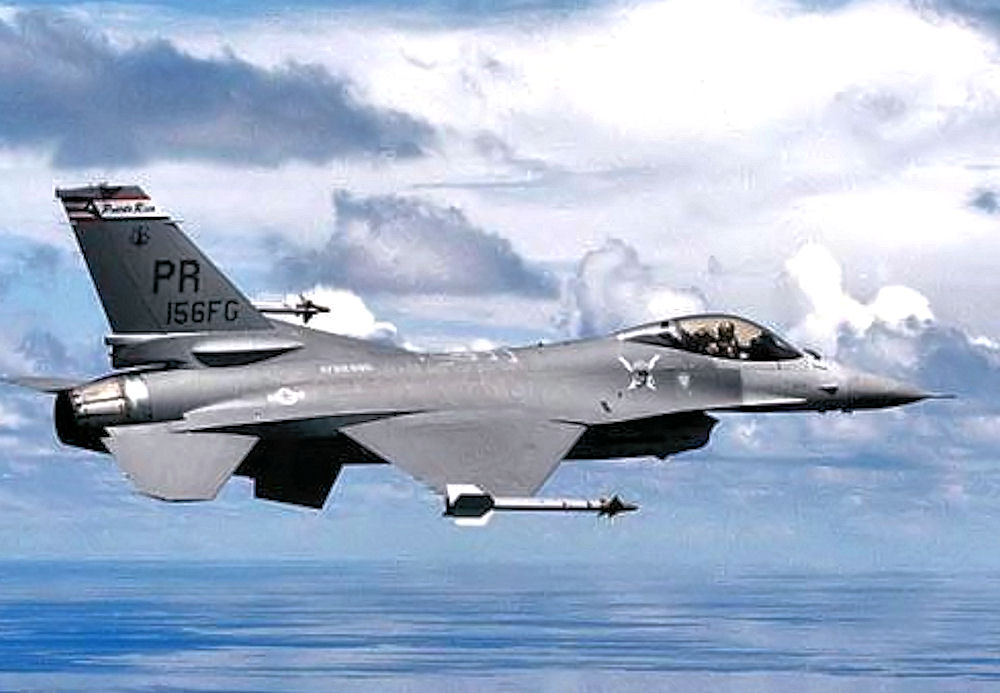
198th Fighter Squadron Block 15 F-16A ADF Fighting Falcon 82-0995

In March 1992, with the end of the Cold War, the 156th adopted the Air Force Objective Organization plan, and the unit was redesignated as the 156th Fighter Group. A few months later, on 1 June, Tactical Air Command was inactivated as part of the Air Force reorganization after the end of the Cold War. It was replaced by Air Combat Command.

In October 1995, in accordance with the Air Force "One Base – One Wing" policy, the status of the 156th was upgraded to a wing; the 198th Fighter Squadron being assigned to the new 156th Operations Group.

==== Airlift Mission ====
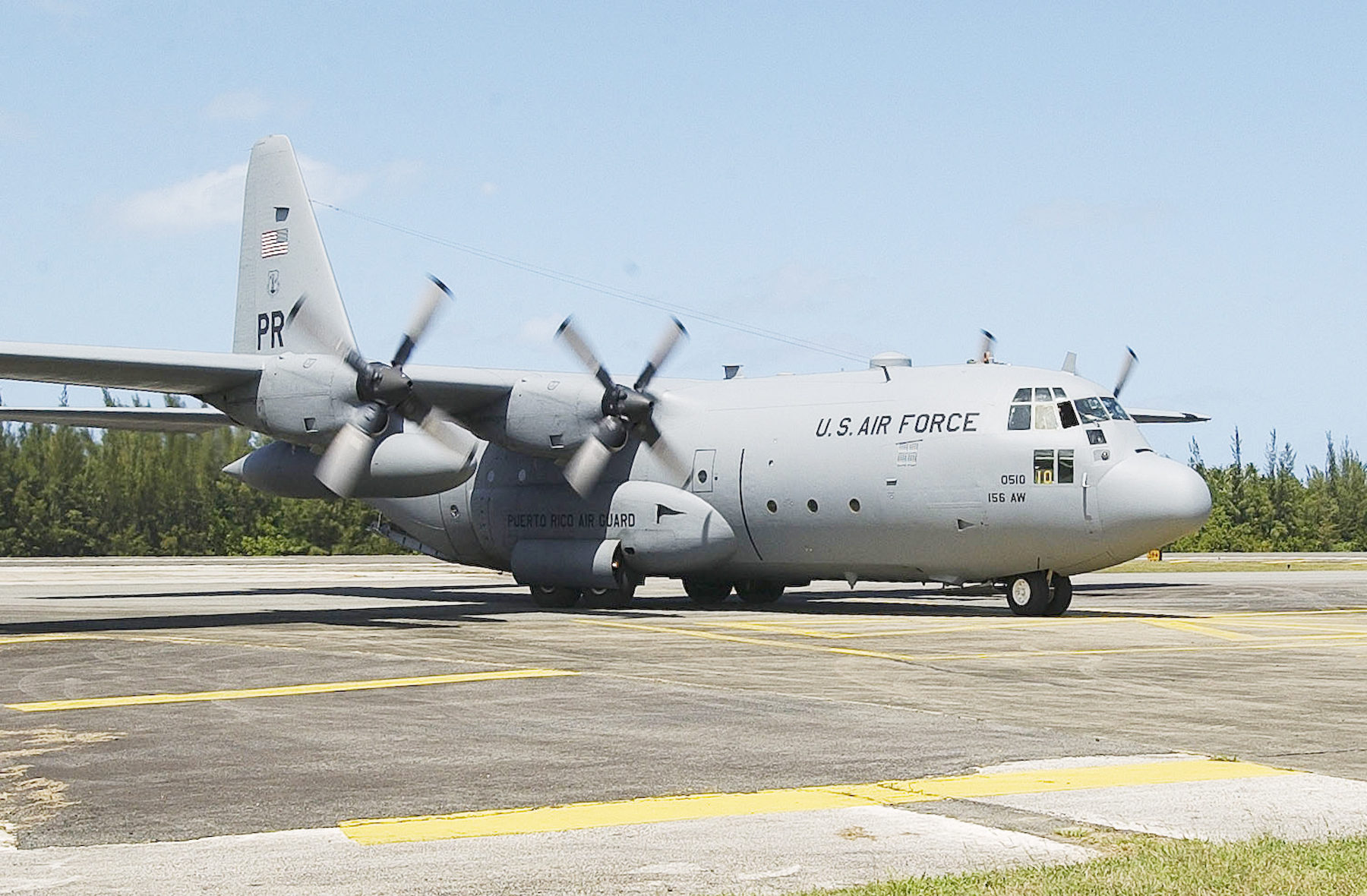
C-130E Hercules 64-0510 from the 198th Airlift Squadron at Muñiz Air National Guard Base

In 1998, the Department of the Air Force issued the official order designating the 156th Fighter Wing as 156th Airlift Wing. The 156th's gaining command on mobiliztion became Air Mobility Command.

Beginning in June 1999, the major mission for the wing became support of Operation Coronet Oak, which was transferred from Howard Air Force Base, Panama when the base was closed as part of the turnover of the Panama Canal.

The mission also includes any other kind of contingency and logistics support. Aircrews provide theater mobility, embassy support and airdrops. They also fly people, food and mail. The 198th Airlift Squadron was 8inactivated on 31 December 2019.

=== Lineage ===
198th Fighter Squadron emblem

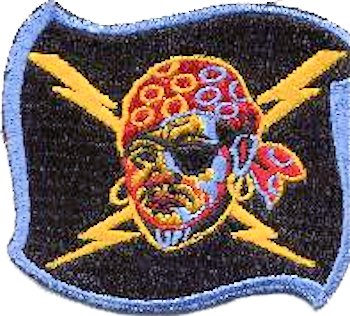
198th Fighter-Interceptor Squadron – Emblem

- Constituted as the 463d Fighter Squadron on 5 October 1944

Activated on 12 October 1944
Inactivated on 27 May 1946

- Redesignated 198th Fighter Squadron and allotted to the National Guard on 24 May 1946.

Received federal recognition and activated on 23 November 1947
Redesignated 198th Fighter-Interceptor Squadron on 1 July 1952
Redesignated 198th Tactical Fighter Squadron on 10 April 1958
Redesignated 198th Fighter Squadron on 15 March 1992
Redesignated 198th Airlift Squadron on 1 October 1998
Inactivated c. 31 December 2019

=== Assignments ===
- 507th Fighter Group, 12 October 1944 – 27 May 1946
- Puerto Rico National Guard, 23 November 1947

Allocated to: Caribbean Air Command

- 156th Tactical Fighter Group (later 156th Fighter Groupp}, 10 April 1958
- 156th Operations Group, 1 October 1995 – c. 31 December 2019

=== Stations ===
- Bruning Army Airfield, Nebraska, 20 October 1944
- Dalhart Army Air Field, Texas, 15 December 1944 – 30 April 1945
- Ie Shima Airfield, Okinawa, 24 June 1945
- Yontan Airfield, Okinawa, 29 January-27 May 1946.
- Isla Grande Airport, San Juan, Puerto Rico, 23 November 1947
- Luis Muñoz Marín International Airport (later Muñiz Air National Guard Base), Carolina, Puerto Rico, 1 May 1956 – c. 31 December 2019

=== Aircraft ===
- Republic P-47N (later F-47N) Thunderbolt, 1944–1945, 1947–1954
- North American F-86E Sabre, 1954–1956
- North American F-86D Sabre, 1956–1958
- North American F-86H Sabre, 1958–1967
- Lockheed F-104C/D Starfighter, 1967–1975
- LTV A-7D Corsair II, 1975–1992
- General Dynamics Block 15 F-16A/B Fighting Falcon, 1992–1998
- Fairchild C-26 Metroliner, 1992–1998
- Lockheed C-130E Hercules, 1998 – 2013
- Lockheed WC-130H Hercules, 2013– 2 May 2018
