= 156th Wing =

Unit of the Puerto Rico Air National Guard

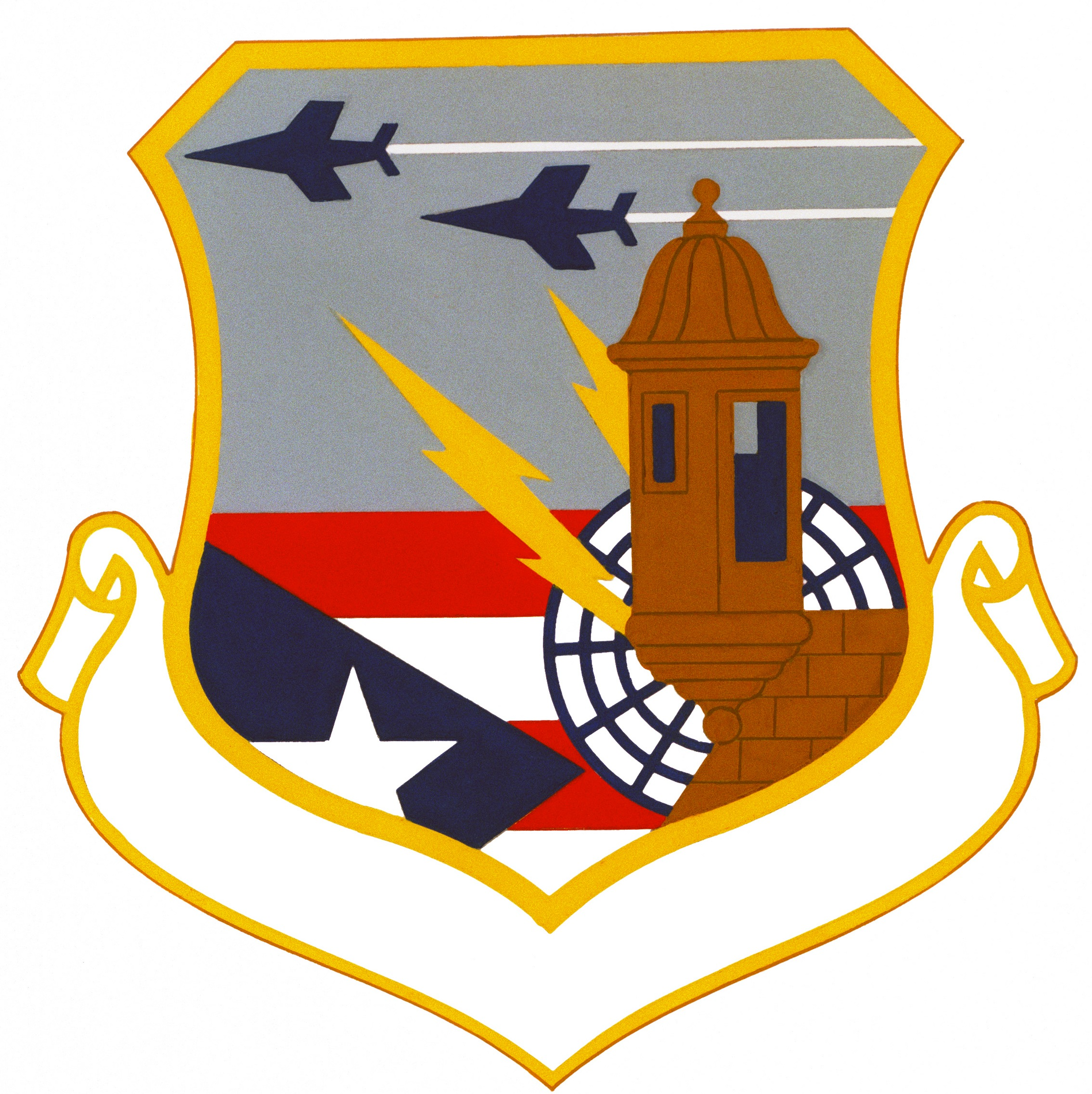
156th Wing

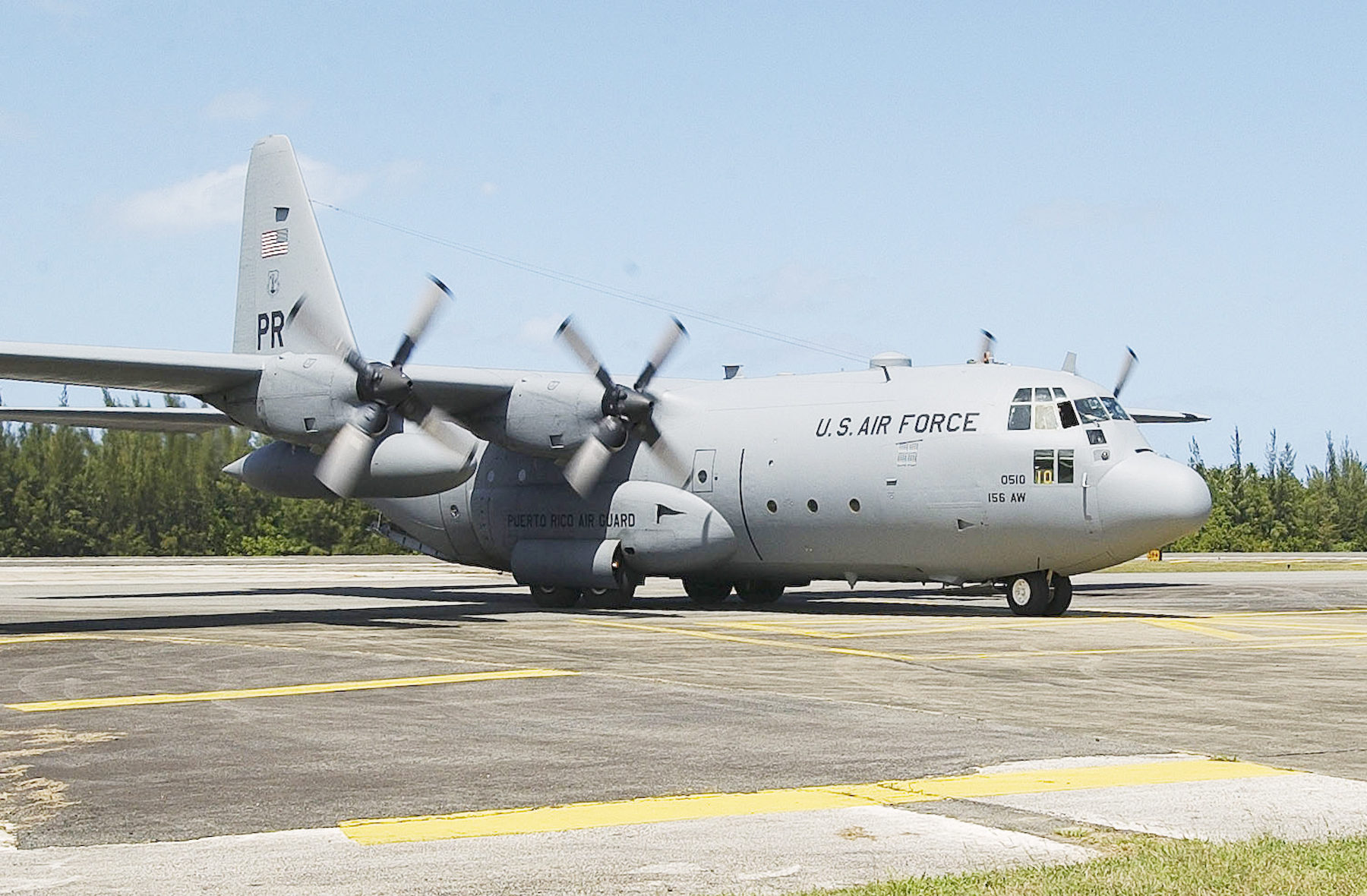
- Squadron Lockheed C-130 Hercules (Note: Aircraft is C-130E-LM Hercules, serial 64-0510.)
- Active: 1958 – present
- Country: United States
- Branch: Air National Guard
- Type: Wing
- Role: Contingency response and combat communications
- Part of: Puerto Rico Air National Guard
- Garrison/HQ: Muñiz Air National Guard Base, Puerto Rico
- Decorations: Air Force Outstanding Unit Award
- Website: 156wg.ang.af.mil

Commanders
- Commander: Col Evaristo M. Orengo
- Chief Master Sergeant: CMSgt Orlando Soto

Insignia
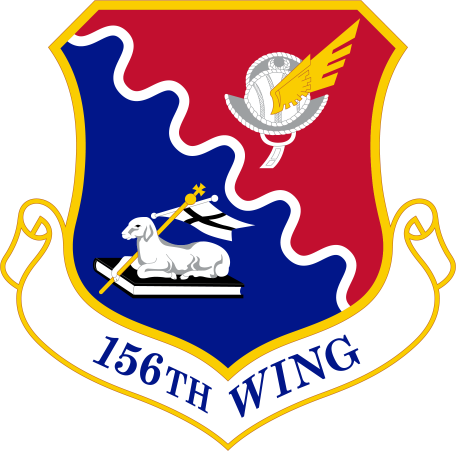
- 156th Wing emblem

The 156th Wing is a unit of the Puerto Rico Air National Guard (PR ANG), stationed at Muñiz Air National Guard Base, in Carolina, Puerto Rico. If activated to federal service with the United States Air Force, the wing is operationally gained by the Air Mobility Command (AMC). It was first activated as the 156th Tactical Fighter Group in 1962.

The wing's flying unit, the 198th Airlift Squadron (198 AS), was inactivated circa 2019.

== Units ==
The 156th Airlift Wing consists of the following major units:

- 156th Operations Group
- 156th Contingency Response Group
- 156th Mission Support Group
- 156th Medical Group

== History ==
=== Tactical Fighter mission ===
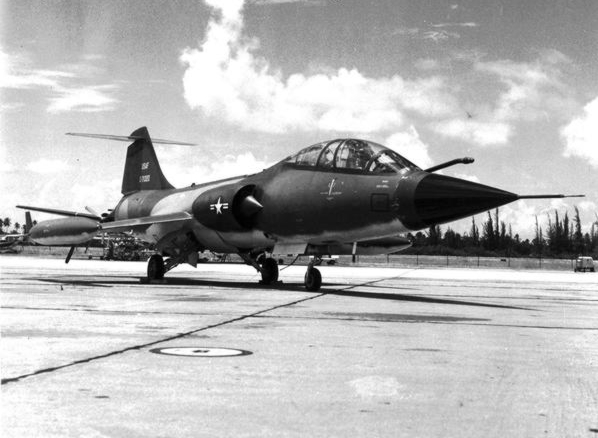
F-104D Starfighter of the 198th Tactical Fighter Squadron.

On 15 October 1962, the Puerto Rico Air National Guard was expanded to a Group status, and the 156th Tactical Fighter Group (156 TFG) was recognized and activated by the National Guard Bureau. The 156th was transferred to the operational claimancy of the Tactical Air Command (TAC), with the 198th Fighter-Interceptor Squadron being reassigned from Air Defense Command (ADC), becoming a tactical fighter squadron as the 198 TFS assigned to the 156 TFG. Other squadrons assigned into the group were the 156th Headquarters, 156th Material Squadron (Maintenance), 156th Combat Support Squadron, and the 156th USAF Dispensary. With the transfer to TAC, the 198th TFS received F-86H Sabre tactical fighters.

In 1967, F-104C Starfighers (and an F-104D two-seat trainer) were assigned to the 156th, upgrading the group to Mach-2 supersonic tactical fighter-bombers, replacing the elderly F-86H Sabre fighter-bombers. The F-104C was equipped to carry bombs or rocket pods on under-wing and fuselage points. The upward-firing Lockheed C-2 rocket-boosted ejector seat was standard. The internal 20-mm rotary cannon of the F-104A was retained, as well as the ability to carry an AIM-9 Sidewinder air-to-air missile on each wingtip to fill an air defense interceptor mission.

In 1975, the F-104s were retired, the 198th being the last USAF unit to fly the Starfighter. The F-104s were replaced by A-7D Corsair II attack aircraft. Although designed primarily as a ground attack aircraft, it also had limited air-to-air combat capability.

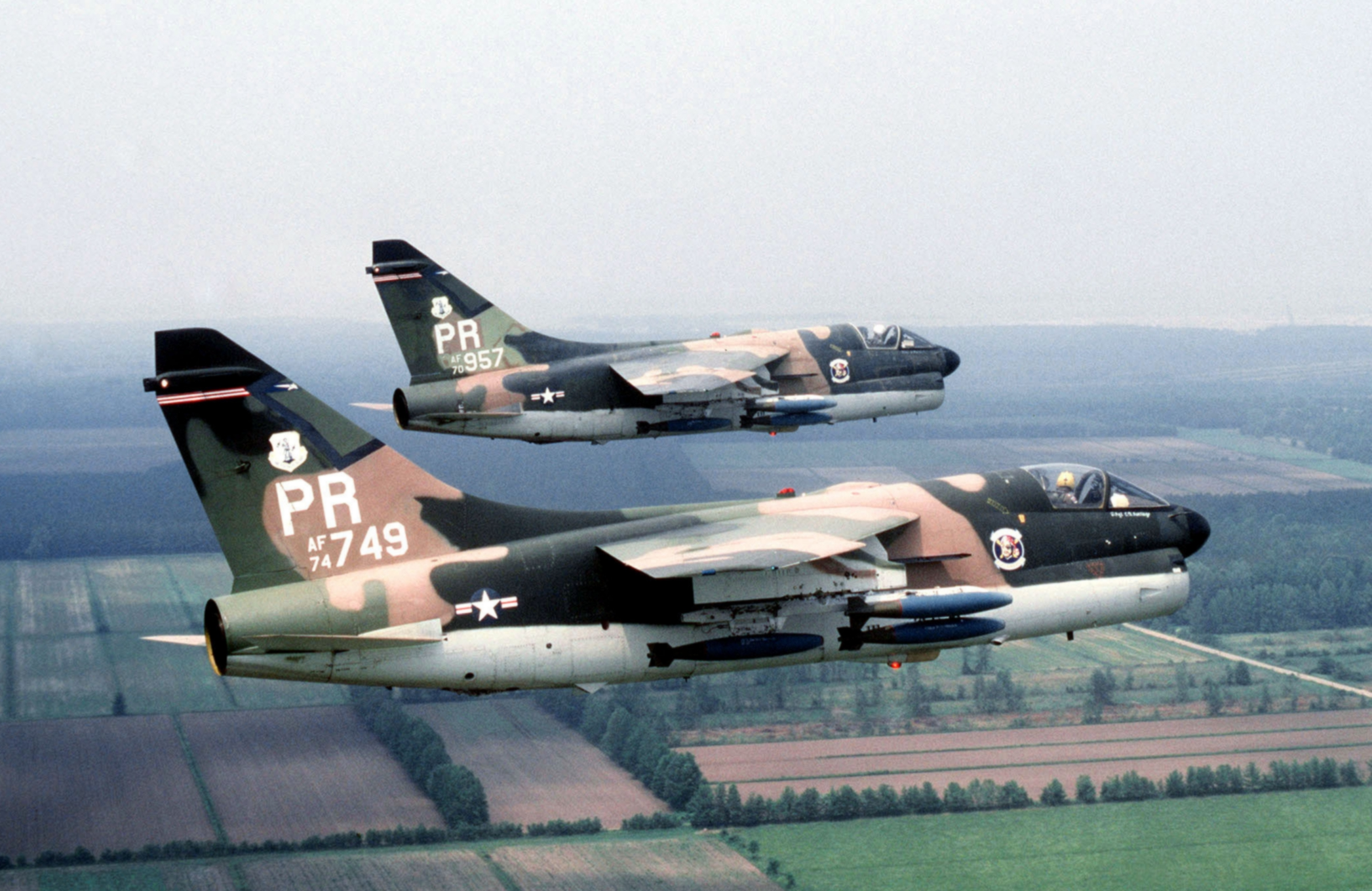
A-7D Corsair II aircraft, AF Ser. No. 70–0957 and 74–1749, assigned to the 198th Tactical Fighter Squadron during exercise "Solid Shield 78" on 1 May 1978.

On 12 January 1981, the Boricua Popular Army, also known as the Macheteros, a group of home grown Marxist aligned Puerto Rican terrorists advocating separation from the United States and establishment of Puerto Rico as an independent nation, infiltrated Muñiz Air National Guard Base. Armed with pipe bombs, they destroyed or damaged a total of eleven PR ANG aircraft: ten A-7D Corsair IIs and a single F-104 Starfighter being retained for eventual static display as a memorial. The terrorist attack was the largest on any U.S. Air Force installation since the Vietnam War, although the ongoing hostage situation in Iran at the time overshadowed this incident in the news media. The eleven Air National Guard jets at Muñiz Air National Guard Base were alleged by socialist organizations to be destined for use against popular insurgents in El Salvador. These allegations were never proven and may have been self-serving propaganda.

At the time, the 156 TFG had a combination of both part-time Traditional Guardsmen (TG) and full-time Air Reserve Technicians (ART) and Active Guard and Reserve (AGR).

The wing's official website writes:

At the time, the base had 25 pilots and 900 military personnel assigned. This loss was calculated at $45 million [dollar value at the time]. The security increased from 11 to 22 personnel with 100% federal funding. The Air Force/Air National Guard invested $5.5 million in Electronic Security Equipment (ESE), a Master Surveillance Control Facility (MSCF), and fencing to secure the flight line and operations area. In addition, Muñiz Air National Guard Base was provided a security police manpower package of 18 AGR security police personnel and 46 civilian contract guards.

On 1 August 1987, the 156th Tactical Fighter Group reorganized into a four-deputy structure according to the new Air National Guard policy where organizational structures would mirror the Regular Air Force and the then-Air Force Reserve.

The unit took part, from 24 to 28 June 1991, in Exercise GRANADA SOUTH in Panama. From 11 to 18 August 1991, it deployed to Iquique, Chile for Exercise CONDOR II Exercise and then from 18 to 24 August 1991, to Asuncion with the Paraguayan Air Force for training. From 7–20 September 1991, it deployed to Exercise FORTUNATA II at Volk Field, Wisconsin and then again from 2–6 December 1991 for another GRANADA SOUTH exercise in Panama.

In March 1992, with the end of the Cold War, the 156th Tactical Fighter Group adopted the Air Force Objective Organization plan, and the unit was re-designated as the 156th Fighter Group (156 FG). A few months later, on 1 June 1992, Tactical Air Command (TAC) was inactivated as part of the Air Force reorganization after the end of the Cold War and was replaced by Air Combat Command (ACC), which became the 156th's new operational gaining command.

Also in 1992, the A-7Ds were also retired and were replaced by Block 15 F-16A/B Fighting Falcon aircraft modified for the Continental Air Defense mission. The F-16ADF was a standard Block 15 model converted to air defense fighters for the Air National Guard and would take over the fighter interception mission, providing the primary defense of North America against bombers and cruise missiles.

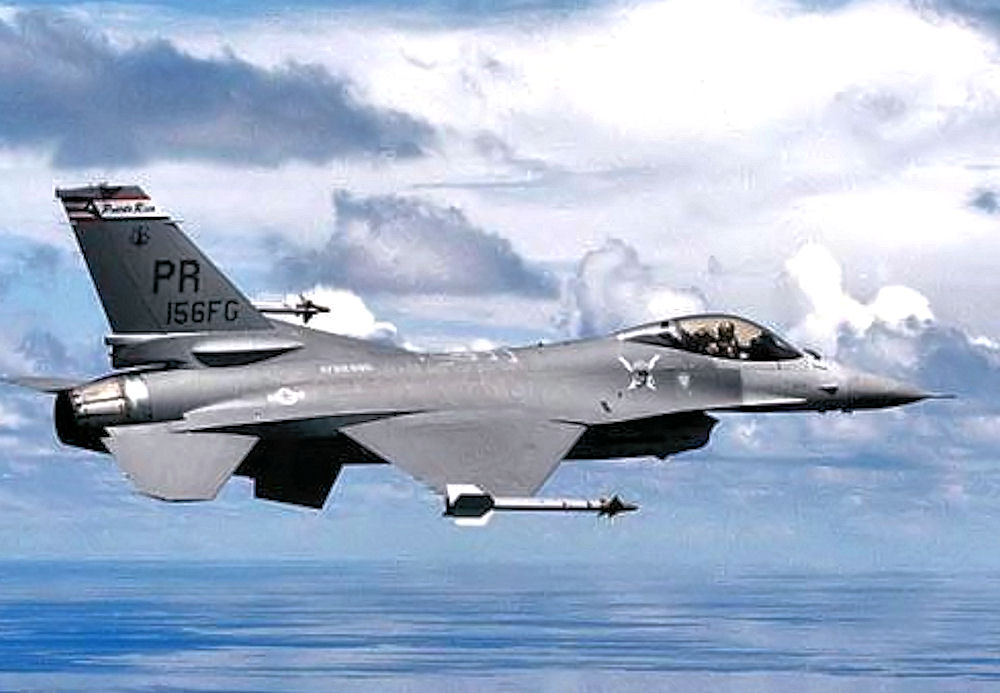
198th Fighter Squadron Block 15 F-16A ADF Fighting Falcon 82-0995

From 20 February to 6 March 1993, the unit took part in the "Caminos de Paz" exercise at Golfito, and then deployed from 12 to 21 August 1993, to Asunción, Paraguay, marking its First F-16 Deployment. From 5–13 November 1994, the unit took part in the Condor III Exercise held in Iquique, Chile.

In October 1995, in accordance with the Air Force "One Base - One Wing" policy, the status of the 157th was upgraded to a wing status and redesignated as the 156th Fighter Wing (156 FW) with the 198th Fighter Squadron (198 FS) being assigned to the newly established 156th Operations Group (156 OG).

=== Airlift mission ===
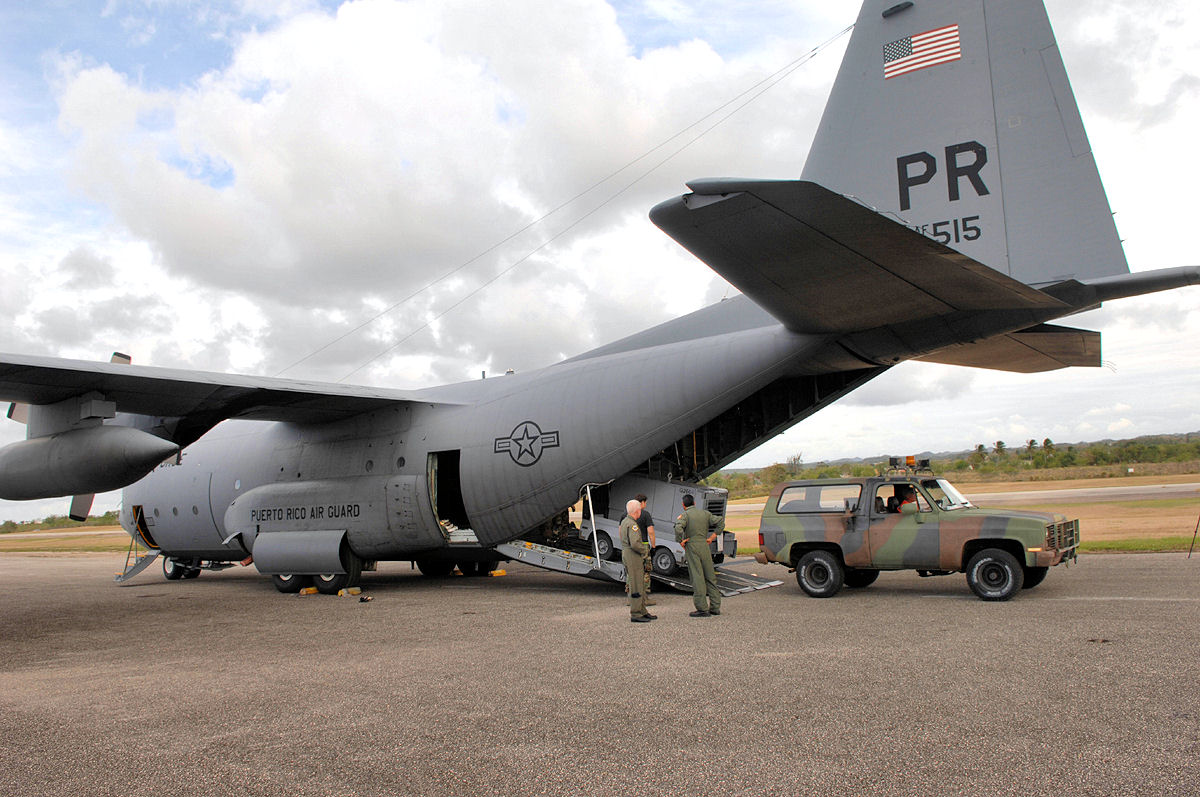
C-130E Hercules from the 198th Airlift Squadron

On 22 November 1997, the 156 FW received its first C-130E Hercules aircraft, ostensibly as a single Operational Support Aircraft (OSA), while celebrating its 50th federal recognition anniversary. On 10 February 1998, the Air Force announced the conversion of the 156th Fighter Wing from its F-16A and F-16B ADF fighter mission to an airlift mission with C-130E aircraft. On 3 March 1998 the last F-16A departed from the 156th Fighter Wing and on 11 September 1998 a ceremony was held to mark the arrival of the first C-130E dedicated to the airlift mission. On 1 October 1998, the Department of the Air Force issued the official order designating the 156th Fighter Wing as 156th Airlift Wing (156 AW) and operational claimancy for the 156th was subsequently transferred to the Air Mobility Command (AMC). The 198 FS was also redesignated as the 198th Airlift Squadron (198 AS).

Beginning in June 1999, the major mission for the 156 AW became support of Operation Coronet Oak, airlift for U.S. Southern Command in the command's Area of Responsibility (AOR). Coronet Oak was transferred from Howard AFB, Panama when that base was closed as part of the turnover of the Panama Canal. Coronet Oak missions ranged from U.S. embassy support throughout Central America and South America, to engagement with partner nation military forces, support humanitarian and disaster relief (HA/DR) missions, and other taskings, to include the ability to deliver U.S. special operations forces (SOF) to any location in theater, as directed by USSOUTHCOM. In addition to the 156 AW, Air Force Reserve Command (AFRC) and other Air National Guard (ANG) C-130 aircraft, aircrews and supporting personnel routinely deploy from the United States to Muniz ANGB to provide theater airlift support for USSOUTHCOM under Coronet Oak. One C-130 of the 156 AW was on alert 24 hours a day, seven days a week, 365 days a year, in order to deliver SOF as required.

Coronet Oak aircraft would share the Muñiz ANGB flight line with the Puerto Rico Air National Guard.

==== Operational Challenges ====
The 156th retired the C-130Es in 2012, being one of the last units still operating the type. Six WC-130Hs were transferred to the unit from the former 118th Airlift Wing (118 AW) of the Tennessee Air National Guard (TN ANG) as that unit transitioned to a remotely piloted aircraft (RPA) mission with the MQ-9 Predator. The 118 AW had previously received these WC-130H aircraft from the 403rd Wing (403 WG) of the Air Force Reserve Command (AFRC) as that unit transitioned to the WC-130J and C-130J.

The problem with the WC-130H aircraft received by the PR ANG were multifold:

First, the WC-130H had been derived from former HC-130H CROWN aircraft, subsequently converted to HC-130P aircraft, that were considered excess at the end of the Vietnam War. Built in the mid-1960s, they were effectively C-130E series airframes, not much different from the pure C-130E aircraft the 156 AW had just retired.

Secondly, modified and redesignated as WC-130H aircraft, they were configured as non-combat coded weather reconnaissance "Hurricane Hunter" aircraft. As such, they had not received the system and avionics upgrades added to combat coded C-130E and C-130H airlift aircraft.

In short, the WC-130Hs had simply been stripped of their weather reconnaissance equipment and configured for the cargo and passenger carrying theater airlift mission while still retaining their WC-130H mission design series (MDS) designation. As of April 2018, U.S. Air Force and Air National Guard plans called for the 156 AW to eventually transition to combat coded C-130H2 aircraft that would be transferred from one or more AMC, AFRC and/or ANG C-130H airlift wings as those units transitioned to the C-130J Super Hercules aircraft.

==== WC-130H Fatal Aircraft Mishap ====
On 2 May 2018, a 198th Airlift Squadron flight crew was in the process of transferring a WC-130H, AF Ser. No. 65-0968, on its final flight to long-term storage with the 309th Aerospace Maintenance and Regeneration Group (309 AMARG) at Davis-Monthan AFB, Arizona. This flight included a stopover at Savannah Air National Guard Base at Savannah-Hilton Head International Airport, Georgia. During takeoff roll, the aircraft sustained a malfunction in the Number 1 engine that was initially unrecognized by the crew. Upon recognizing the engine problem, the crew failed to complete the Takeoff Continued After Engine Failure procedure, the Engine Shutdown procedure, and the After Takeoff checklist as directed by the aircraft's flight manual. At approximately 900 feet mean sea level and 131 knots indicated air speed, the aircraft commander inputted over nine degrees of left rudder, turning into the malfunctioning engine that he had called for shutdown. The aircraft skidded left, the left wing stalled, and the aircraft departed controlled flight and impacted the ground, destroying the aircraft and killing all flight crew and passengers.

The subsequent USAF Aircraft Accident Investigation Board Report stated that the mishap pilot's improper application of left rudder resulted in a subsequent skid below three-engine minimum controllable airspeed, a left-wing stall, and the mishap aircraft's departure from controlled flight. In addition, it was found that aircraft commander's failure to reject the takeoff, the crew's failure to properly execute appropriate after takeoff and engine shutdown checklists and procedures, and the failure of 156 AW's aircraft maintenance personnel to properly diagnose and repair issues with the aircraft's Number 1 engine before releasing it for flight contributed to the mishap. A culture of apathy and poor morale in the 156 AW, exacerbated by training, readiness and combat capability that had been often neglected and in decline for years, were also considered to be contributing factors in the Air Force's and the National Guard Bureau's decision to transition the 156th to a non-flying mission for the foreseeable future in order for the unit to regain its operational footing and mission focus.

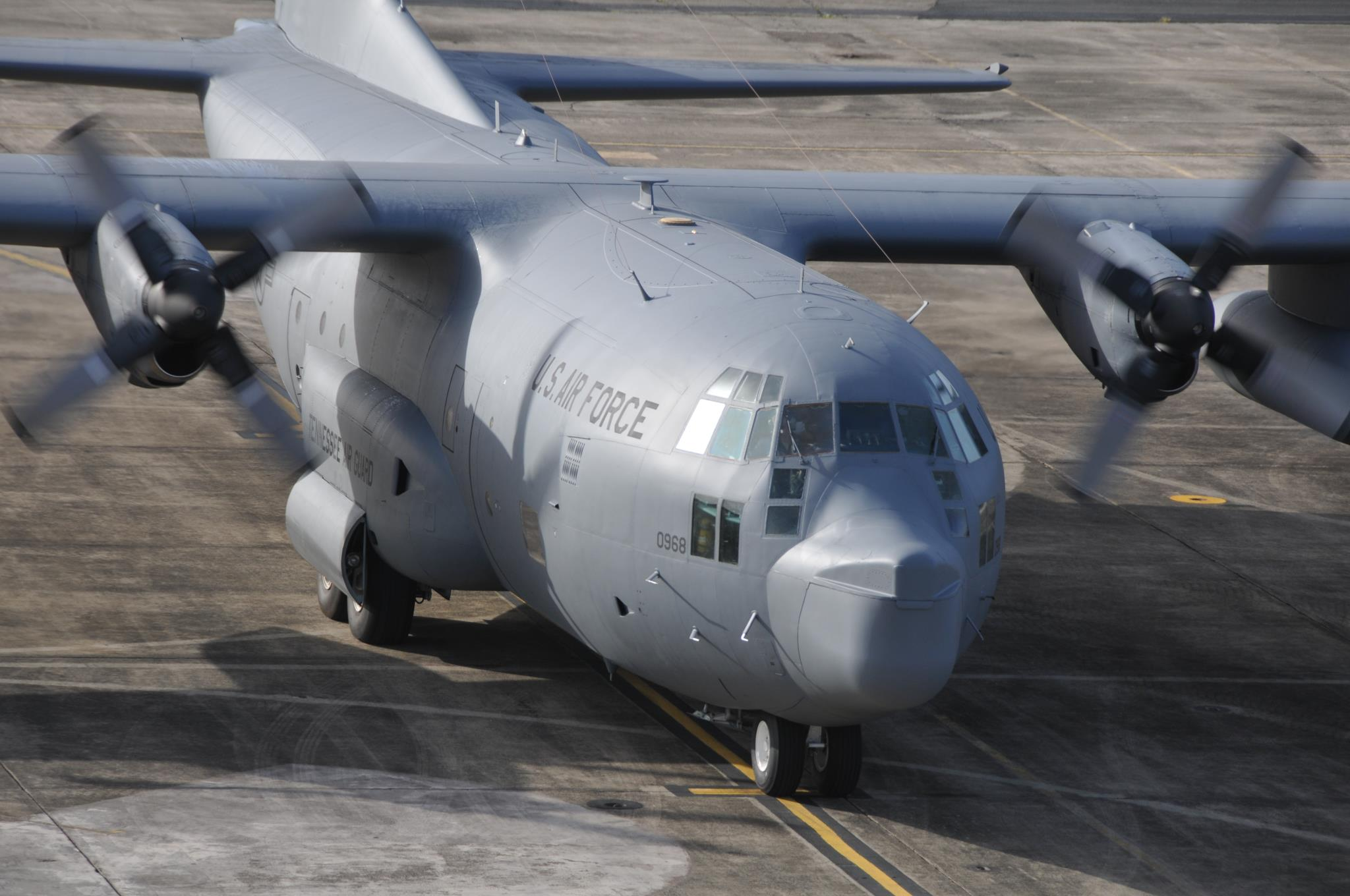
WC-130H Hercules, AF Ser. No. 65-0968, of the 198th Airlift Squadron, 156 AW, PR ANG on its delivery from the TN ANG. This aircraft and its PR ANG crew were lost in a fatal mishap on 2 May 2018 shortly after takeoff.

=== Loss of flying mission ===
On 10 April 2019, the wing was redesignated the 156th Wing to reflect its transition to a new mission, which will combine contingency response and combat communications. While the designation change was effective in April 2019, the unit's transition to the new mission is expected to take three years. Coronet Oak and other air mobility missions by AMC, AFRC and other ANG units and aircraft and counter-narcotics (CN) missions by ACC, other AFRC, and other ANG units and aircraft will continue to utilize Muñiz Air National Guard Base on a periodic basis, with the 156 WG providing support to these transient units.

=== Contingency Response Mission ===
The 156th Contingency Response Group (156 CRG) was established on 1 January 2020. The 156 CRG will eventually become a four squadron group.

== Lineage ==
- Established as the 156th Fighter Group (Air Defense) and allotted to Puerto Rico Air National Guard in 1958

Received federal recognition and activated on 10 April 1958
Redesignated 156th Tactical Fighter Group c. 1 April 1964
Redesignated 156th Fighter Group on 15 March 1992
Redesignated: 156th Fighter Wing on 1 October 1995
Redesignated: 156th Airlift Wing on 1 October 1998
Redesignated 156th Wing on 10 April 2019

=== Assignments ===
- Puerto Rico Air National Guard, 10 April 1958

Gained by Air Defense Command, 10 April 1958
Gained by Tactical Air Command, c. 1 April 1964
Gained by Air Combat Command, 1 June 1992
Gained by Air Mobility Command, 1 October 1998 – present

=== Components ===
Groups

- 156th Medical Group (see 156th USAF Dispensary)
- 156th Mission Support Group, March 1994 – present
- 156th Operations Group (Flying Ops), 1 March 1994 – 31 December 2019
- 156th Operations Group (Non-kinetic), 1 January 2020 – present
- 156th Contingency Response Group, 1 January 2020 – present

Squadrons

Operational squadrons

- 198th Fighter-Interceptor Squadron (later 198th Tactical Fighter Squadron, 198th Fighter Squadron, 198th Airlift Squadron), 10 April 1958 – 31 December 2019
- 141st Tactical Control Squadron (later 141st Air Control Squadron), c. 1982 – present
- 156th Combat Communications Squadron, 1 January 2020 - present

Contingency Response squadrons

- 156th Contingency Response Squadron, 1 January 2020 - present
- 156th Contingency Response Support Squadron, 1 January 2020 - present
- 156th Tactical Advisory Squadron, 1 January 2020 - present
- 156th Security Operations Squadron, 1 January 2020 - present

Support squadrons

- 156th Air Base Squadron (later 156th Combat Support Sq, 156th Mission Support Squadron), 10 April 1958 – 1 March 1994
- 156th Civil Engineering Squadron (see 156th Civil Engineering Flight)
- 156th Consolidated Aircraft Maintenance Squadron (later 156th Maintenance Squadron), 1 January 1959 – 1 March 1994
- 156th Force Support Squadron, - present
- 156th Information Systems Squadron (see 156th Communications Flight)
- 156th Logistics Readiness Squadron, - present
- 156th Materiel Squadron, 10 April 1958 – c. 10 May 1964
- 156th Medical Squadron (see 156th USAF Dispensary)
- 156th Resource Management Squadron, 1 July 1979 – 1 March 1994
- 156th Security Police Squadron (see 156th Weapons System Security Flight)
- 156th Supply Squadron, 20 May 1964 – 31 May 1973

Flights

- 156th Civil Engineering Flight (later 156th Civil Engineering Squadron), 1 November 1969 – present
- 156th Communications Flight (later 156th Information Systems Squadron, 156th Communications Flight), 14 June 1966 – present
- 156th Mobility Support Flight, 31 May 1973 – 31 March 1979
- 156th Weapons System Security Flight (later 156th Security Police Flight, 156th Security Police Squadron, 156th Security Forces Squadron), 31 May 1973 – present
- 156th Services Flight, c. 1 March 1988 – 1 March 1994
- 198th Weather Flight, c. 22 July 1961 – 31 January 1967
- 156th Student Flight, 1 March 1994 – present

Other

- 156th USAF Dispensary (later 156th Tactical Dispensary, 156th Tactical Clinic, 156th Medical Squadron, 156th Medical Group), 10 April 1958 – present

=== Stations ===
- Luis Muñoz Marín International Airport (later Muñiz Air National Guard Base), Puerto Rico, 10 April 1958 – present

=== Aircraft ===
- F-86E/D/H Sabre, 1958–1967
- F-104C/D Starfighter, 1967–1975
- A-7D/K Corsair II, 1975–1992
- F-16A/B ADF (Block 15) Fighting Falcon, 1992–1998
- C-26A Metroliner, 1992–1998
- C-130E Hercules, 1998 – 2013
- WC-130H, 2013 – 2018
- C-47
- O-2B
- T-29
- C-131
- U-3A/B Blue Canoe
- L-16
- T-6 Texan
- B-26
- P-47N

=== Decorations ===
- Air Force Outstanding Unit Award

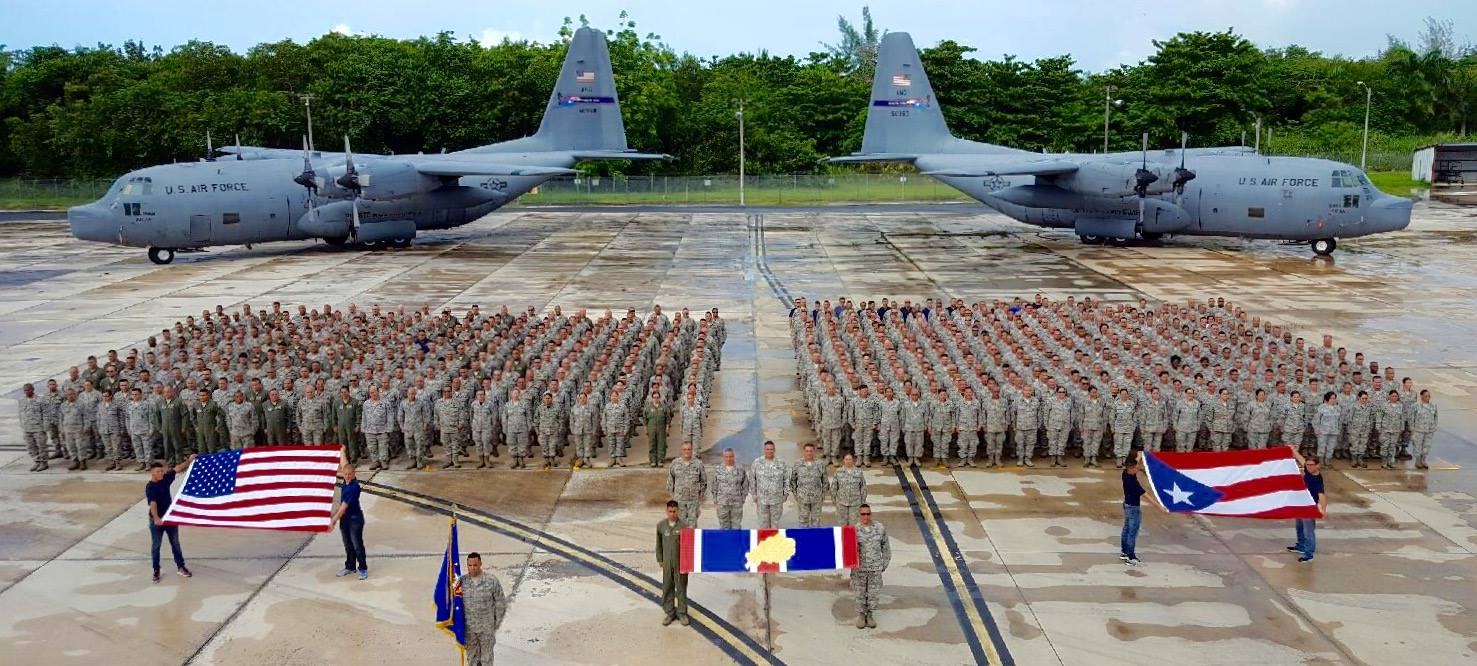
156AW Photo 2016 at Muñiz Air National Guard Base

== See also ==
- Military history of Puerto Rico
- Puerto Rico Adjutant General
