= Muñiz Air National Guard Base =

Home base for the Puerto Rico Air National Guard

- Carolina, Puerto Rico
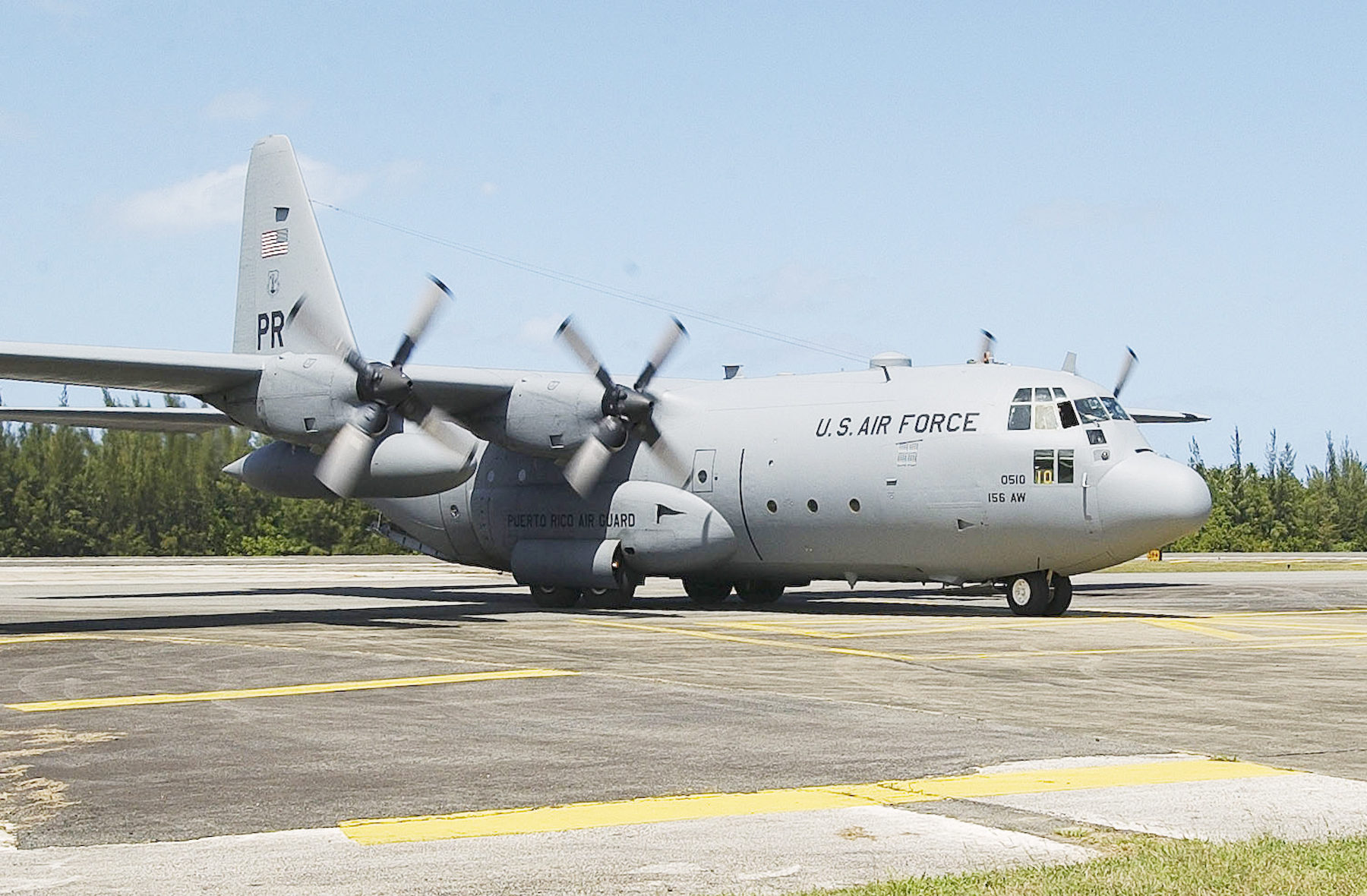
- A C-130E Hercules from the 198th Airlift Squadron based at Muñiz Air National Guard Base.

Site information
- Type: Air National Guard Base
- Owner: Department of Defense
- Operator: US Air Force (USAF)
- Controlled by: Puerto Rico Air National Guard
- Condition: Operational
- Website: www.156aw.ang.af.mil

Location
- Location in Puerto Rico
- Coordinates: 18°26′21″N 66°0′7″W

Site history
- Built: 1956
- In use: 1956 – present

Garrison information
- Current commander: Colonel Pete Boone
- Garrison: 156th Wing

Airfield information
- Identifiers: IATA: SJU, ICAO: TJSJ, FAA LID: SJU, WMO: 785263
- Elevation: 3 metres (10 ft) AMSL
Runways
Direction	Length and surface
8/26	3,169.9 metres (10,400 ft) Asphalt
10/28	2,443.2 metres (8,016 ft) Concrete
- Airfield shared with Luis Muñoz Marín International Airport; Source: Federal Aviation Administration

Muñiz Air National Guard Base is the home base for the Puerto Rico Air National Guard (PR ANG). This installation is located within the grounds of Luis Muñoz Marín International Airport in Carolina, Puerto Rico 14 km (9 miles) east of San Juan, Puerto Rico.

== Overview ==
Muñiz Air National Guard Base also commonly known in Spanish as "Base Muñiz" provides support in local emergencies and mobilization of U.S. military troops from Puerto Rico for deployments worldwide. It provides airlift support for missions of the U.S. Southern Command (USSOUTHCOM) and airlift for joint military exercises while displaying military capabilities and bolster United States ties with our Latin American neighbors. The 198th Airlift Squadron (198 AS), a subordinate unit of the 156th Wing, also located at Muñiz Air National Base provides airlift support. The 156th Airlift Wing is under the Air National Guard/Air Mobility Command.

== History ==
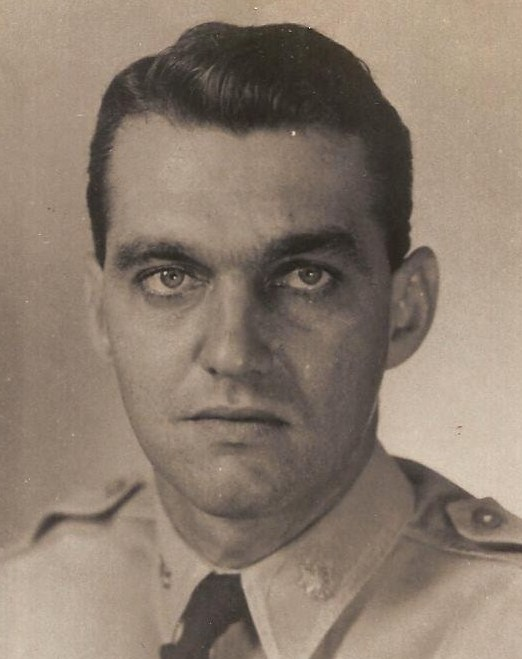
Lieutenant Colonel José Antonio Muñiz, co-founder of the PRANG.

The Puerto Rico Air National Guard consolidated its operations and moved from the Fernando Luis Ribas Dominicci Airport in May 1956 to a new facility at the Isla Verde Airport located in Carolina, Puerto Rico now known as Luis Muñoz Marín International Airport just 14 km (9 miles) east of San Juan, Puerto Rico. On 10 April 1958, the 156th Tactical Fighter reorganized into a Fighter Group. On 1 January 1976, the 156th Tactical Fighter Group converted from F-104 Starfighter to A-7D Corsair. The first A-7s arrived in November and the last in March 1976.

=== Jose Antonio Muñiz ===
In 1963 the Air National Guard Base was renamed "Muñiz Air National Guard Base" while commemorating the 20th anniversary of its federal recognition in honor of Puerto Rico Air National Guard Co-founder, Lieutenant Colonel José Antonio Muñiz a former United States Air Force officer who during World War II served in the United States Army Air Forces. In 1960, Muñiz was killed when his F-86D flamed out on take-off and crashed. The Lieutenant Colonel José Antonio Muñiz Memorial is located at this base.

=== Attack by Macheteros ===
On January 12, 1981, 10 LTV A-7 Corsair IIs and a Lockheed F-104 Starfighter were damaged and destroyed. It is believed that this was a terrorist act made by Boricua Popular Army Machetero commandos that infiltrated into the base. The United States Air Force Office of Special Investigations became in charge of the investigation. The loss was calculated at $45 million. The base Security detail increased from 11 to 22 Air Force Security Police personnel and 46 civilian contract guards.

=== Papal visit and presidential visit ===
On October 12, 1984, Pope John Paul II made the first papal visit to Puerto Rico and was welcomed to Puerto Rico by governor Carlos Romero Barcelo and U.S. State Secretary George P. Shultz at Muñiz ANGB. Pope John Paul II left Puerto Rico on the evening that same day.

On June 14, 2011, United States president Barack Obama made an official visit to Puerto Rico for four hours. He arrived on the 747 Air Force One with Resident Commissioner Pedro Pierluisi at Muñiz Air National Guard Base and he was greeted by Governor Luis Fortuño. Later, after campaigning, President Obama gave a speech from a hangar at Muñiz Air National Guard Base.

=== Air mobility role ===
On November 22, 1997. Muñiz ANGB received its first Lockheed C-130s while celebrating the 50th anniversary of its federal recognition. The Air Force announced conversion of the 156th Fighter Wing from F-16A/B aircraft to C-130 aircraft, changing the task from combat to transport.

=== Operation Coronet Oak ===
Coronet Oak was the name for the continuing operation in which Air Force Reserve Command (AFRC) and Air National Guard (ANG) C-130 aircraft, aircrews and related support personnel deploy from the United States to Muñiz Air National Guard Base, Puerto Rico, to provide theater airlift support for the U.S. Southern Command. The Guard and Reserve support the Coronet Oak mission year round since April 19, 1999 from Muñiz Air National Guard Base when this mission moved from Howard Air Force Base, Panama as result of the U.S. military withdrawal from Panama. Units rotate in and out of Muñiz ANGB every two weeks. Forces assigned to CORONET OAK provide United States Southern Command with logistic and contingency support throughout Central and South America.

== Today ==
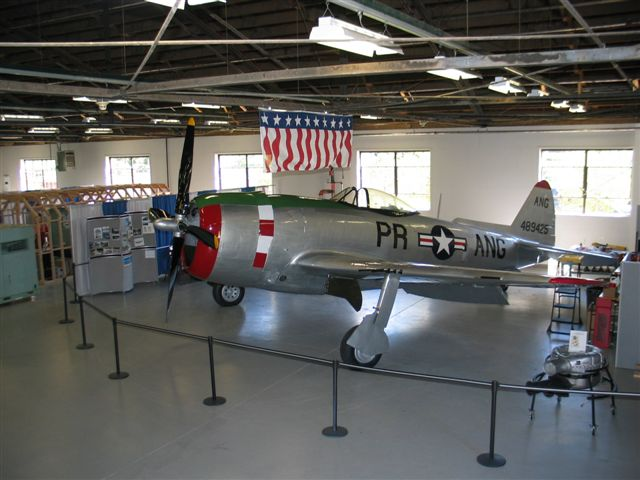
Muñiz's PRANG P-47 on display at Muñiz Air National Guard Base.

Since 1997 the mission for Muñiz Air National Guard base and the 156th Fighter Wing is to provide air mobility support for the U.S. Southern Command. This air base also provides mobilization to assist with humanitarian support in natural disasters such as the 2010 Haiti earthquake. Muñiz ANGB plays a mayor role in the mobilization for the Puerto Rico Air National Guard troops as well Army National Guard and U.S. Army Reserve soldiers from Puerto Rico for deployments to Operation Iraqi Freedom and Operation Enduring Freedom.

Muñiz Air National Guard Base host the STARBASE Youth Program. STARBASE is a nonresidential educational program for students (grades K-12) that provides them with real-world applications of math and science. Hundreds of students from schools all over Puerto Rico come to Muñiz ANGB to participate in the STARBASE Youth Program.

Some Active Guard Reserve personnel from the Puerto Rico Air National Guard work permanently at Muñiz ANGB. In addition some of the facilities at Muñiz ANGB include a Hangar, Maintenance Shops, Command Offices, Airman and Family Readiness Program, Lt. Col. Rafael A. Mattei Sports Complex, NGX Base Exchange and The Puerto Rico National Guard institutional trust (FIGNA) office.

== Based units ==
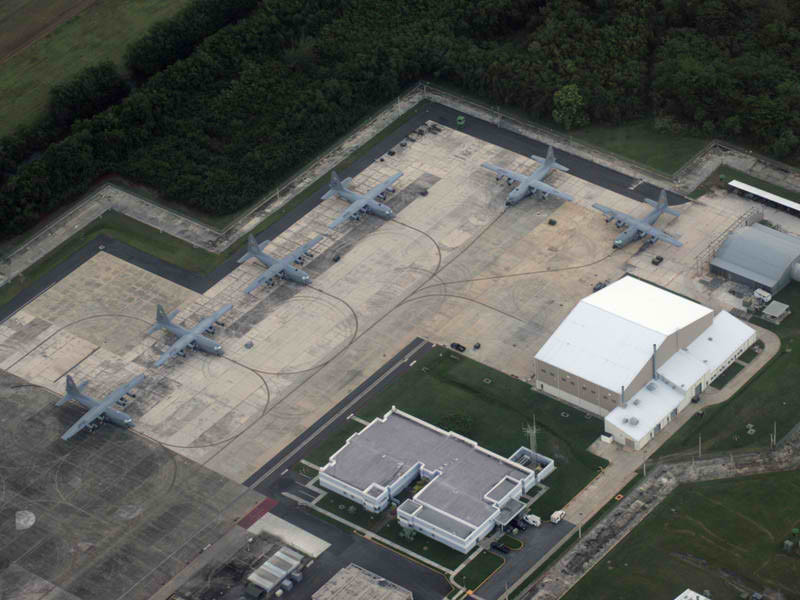
C-130 Hercules planes at Muñiz Air National Guard Base

Flying and notable non-flying units based at Muñiz Air National Guard Base.

=== United States Air Force ===
Air National Guard

- Puerto Rico Air National Guard
  - 156th Wing
    - 156th Operations Group
      - 156th Operations Support Squadron
      - 156th Combat Communications Squadron
      - 198th Airlift Squadron – WC-130E Hercules (inactivated)
    - 156th Maintenance Group
      - 156th Aircraft Maintenance Squadron
      - 156th Maintenance Operations Flight
      - 156th Maintenance Squadron
    - 156th Medical Group
    - 156th Mission Support Group
      - 156th Force Support Squadron
      - 156th Logistics Readiness Squadron
      - 156th Security Forces Squadron
      - 156th Civil Engineer Squadron
      - 156th Communications Flight

== See also ==
- Air National Guard
- Puerto Rico National Guard
- Military of Puerto Rico
- 1st Air Base Group
