= 131st Bomb Wing =

Missouri Air National Guard unit

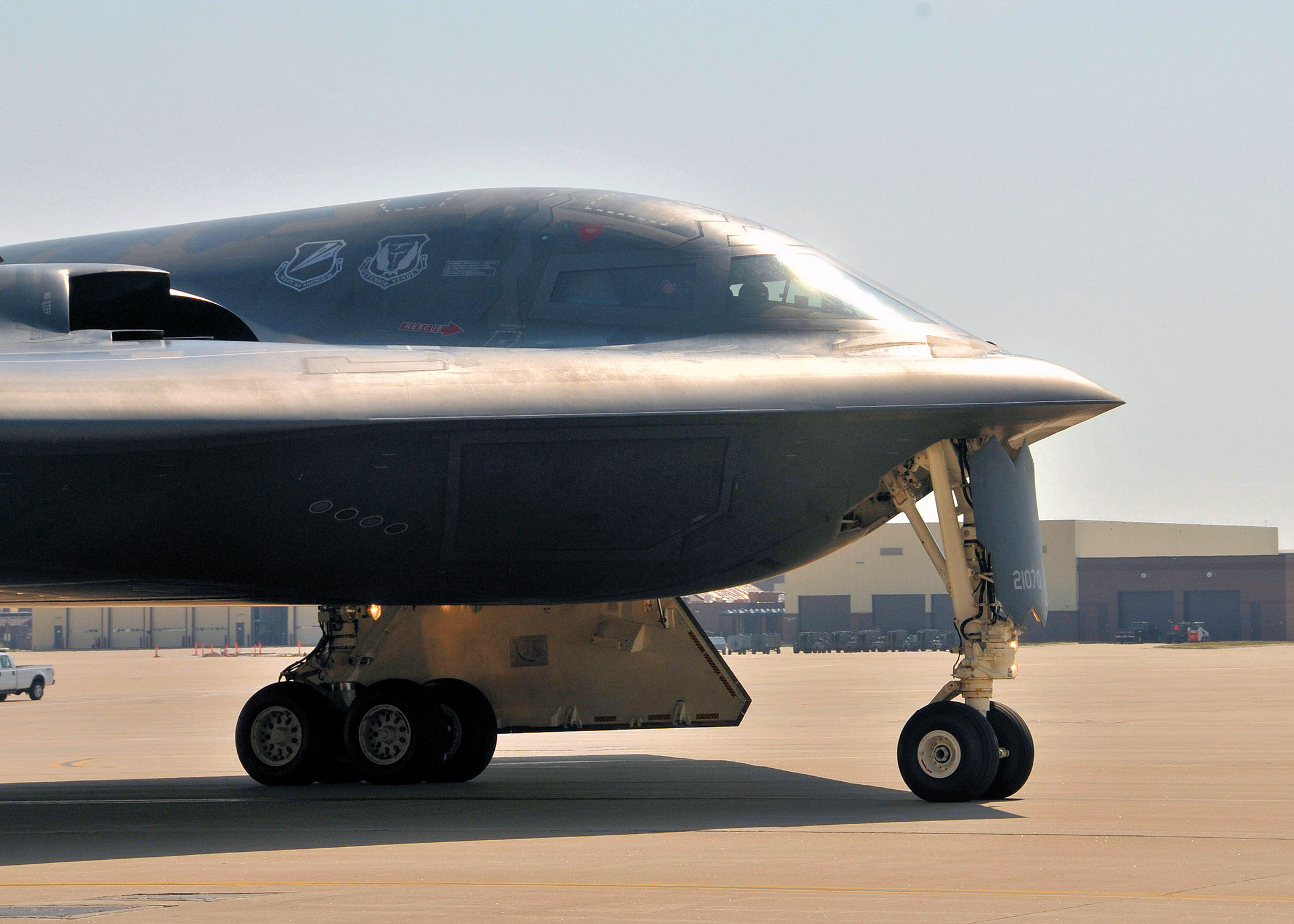
- The B-2 "Spirit of Ohio" returns from a training mission, 27 June 2012
- Active: 1950–present
- Country: United States
- Allegiance: Missouri
- Branch: Air National Guard
- Role: Strategic Bombardment
- Part of: Missouri Air National Guard
- Garrison/HQ: Whiteman Air Force Base, Missouri
- Motto: Parati ad Agendum – "Ready for Action"
- Engagements: World War II; Korean War; Operation Just Cause; Gulf War; Operation Desert Shield; Operation Desert Storm; Operation Northern Watch; Operation Southern Watch; Operation Noble Eagle; Operation Enduring Freedom; Operation Iraqi Freedom; Operation Freedom Sentinel; Operation Spartan Shield; Operation Inherent Resolve; Twelve-Day War; Operation Midnight Hammer
- Decorations: Air Force Outstanding Unit Award

Commanders
- Current commander: Colonel Matthew Howard

Insignia
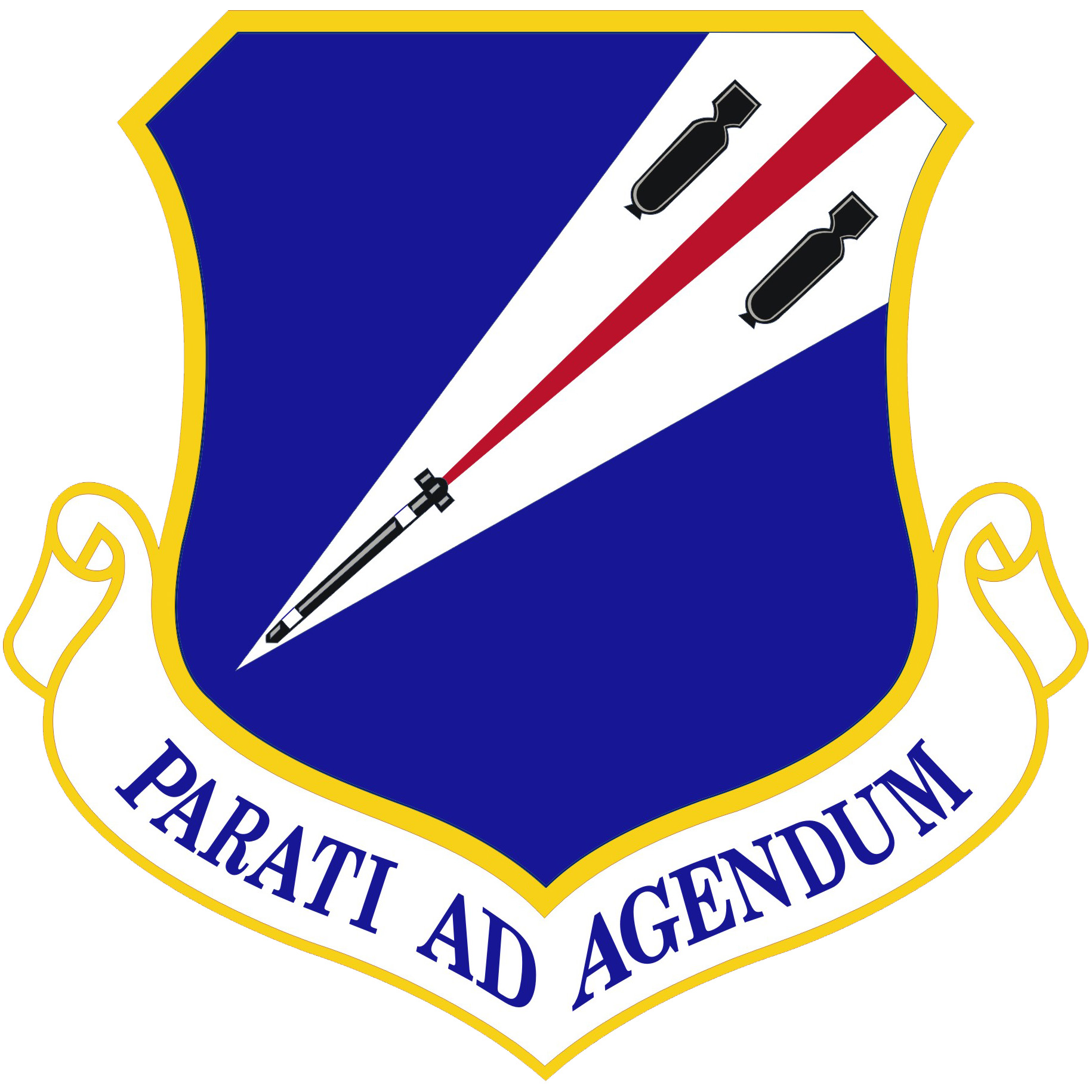
- 131st Bomb Wing emblem

The 131st Bomb Wing (131 BW) is a unit of the Missouri Air National Guard based at Whiteman Air Force Base, Missouri. Its mission is to provide B-2 Spirit global-strike and combat-support capabilities in support of United States Strategic Command and geographic combatant commanders. The wing operates in a "classic associate" arrangement with the active-duty 509th Bomb Wing, which retains ownership of the aircraft and other operational assets while personnel from both wings jointly fly and support B-2 missions.

The wing was organized in 1950 as the 131st Composite Wing. Its history is associated with the 110th Bomb Squadron, whose antecedents include the 110th Aero Squadron of the First World War and the 110th Observation Squadron, which served in the Pacific during the Second World War. The 131st was federalized during the Korean War and again during the 1961 Berlin Crisis, when elements deployed to France.

Following the divestment of its F-15s, the wing moved from the St. Louis area to Whiteman Air Force Base, was redesignated the 131st Bomb Wing in 2008, and transitioned to the B-2 mission as an associate of the 509th Bomb Wing. It became the first Air National Guard B-2 bomb wing and was declared fully mission-capable in 2013.

== Mission ==
The mission of the 131st Bomb Wing is to organize, train, and equip Citizen-Airmen to provide full-spectrum, expeditionary B-2 Spirit global strike and combat support capabilities in support of United States Strategic Command and geographic combatant commanders.

== Organization ==
The 131st Bomb Wing consists of the following units:

- 131st Bomb Wing, at Whiteman Air Force Base
  - Headquarters 131st Bomb Wing
  - 131st Operations Group
    - 110th Bomb Squadron
    - 131st Operations Support Flight
  - 131st Maintenance Group
    - 131st Aircraft Maintenance Squadron
    - 131st Maintenance Squadron
    - 131st Maintenance Operations Flight
  - 131st Medical Group
  - 131st Mission Support Group
    - 131st Civil Engineer Squadron
    - 131st Communications Flight
    - 131st Contracting Squadron
    - 131st Force Support Squadron
    - 131st Logistics Readiness Squadron

== History ==
The 131st Bomb Wing dates back to the early 20th century, with roots to the 110th Aero Squadron of World War I. Established on 14 August 1917, the 110th Aero Squadron was part of the American Expeditionary Forces during the war. After the war ended, the squadron was demobilized in November 1918.

In 1923, the unit was reactivated as the 110th Observation Squadron, one of the 29 original National Guard Observation Squadrons formed before World War II. The unit played a pivotal role in the development of the Missouri Air National Guard. In its early years, it was involved in various reconnaissance and observation missions.

During the Second World War, the 110th Observation Squadron was sent to the Pacific Theater in late 1943, where it conducted combat reconnaissance and attack missions over New Guinea, the Philippines, and other areas. The unit flew aircraft like the A-20 Havoc, B-25 Mitchell, P-40 Warhawk, and F-6 Mustang, eventually earning a Presidential Unit Citation before being inactivated in 1946

=== Missouri Air National Guard ===
The 131st Composite Wing was activated on 1 November 1950 when Continental Air Command reorganized its Air National Guard combat units under the Wing Base structure. Its combat units remained under the 131st Composite Group, while elements of the 231st Air Service Group were assigned to the new 131st Air Base Group and 131st Maintenance & Supply Group.

==== Korean War activation ====
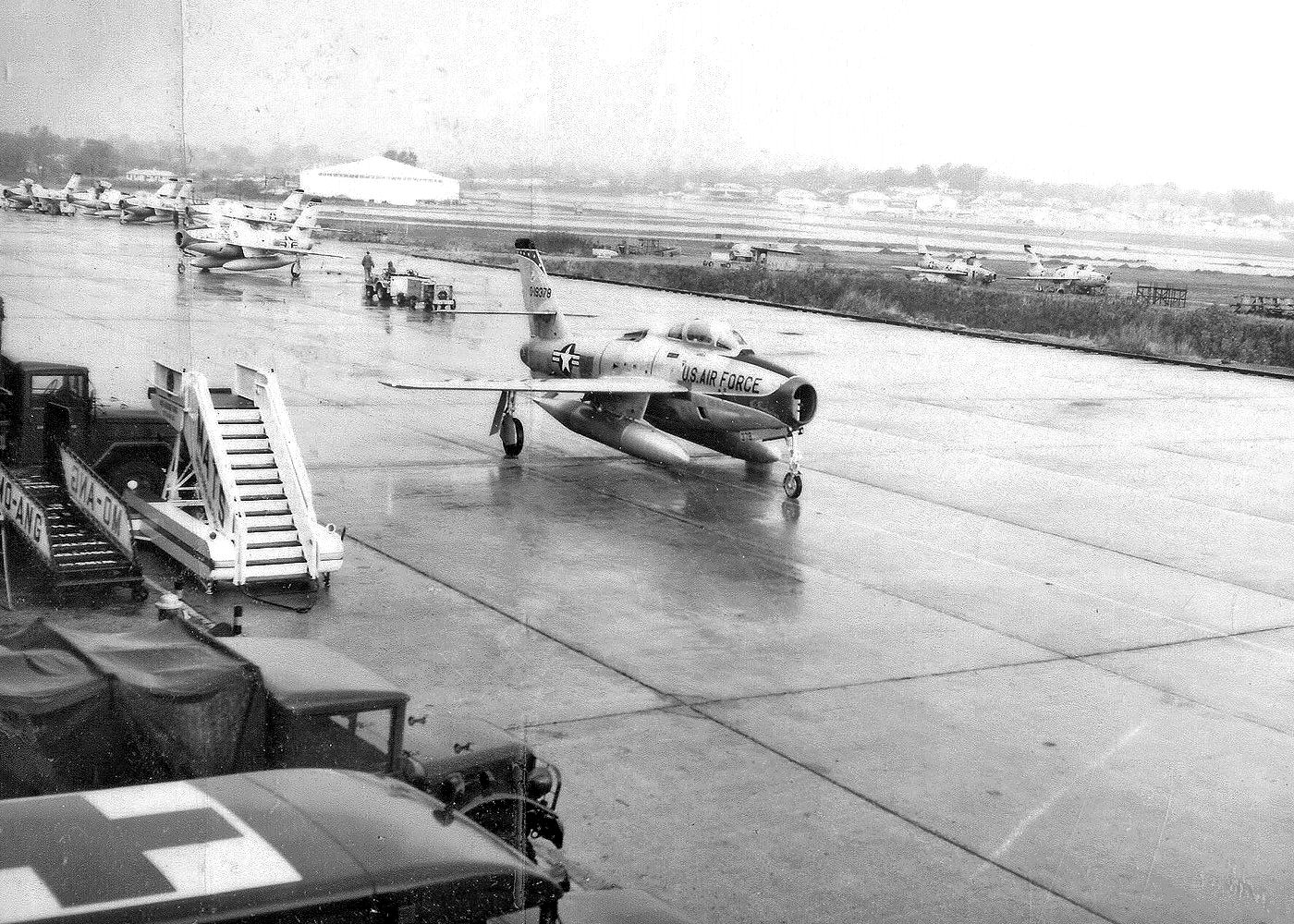
131st TFW F-84F Thunderstreaks at Toul AB, France, 1961

On 1 March 1951 the 110th was federalized and brought to active-duty due to the Korean War. It was initially assigned to Strategic Air Command (SAC) and transferred to Bergstrom AFB, Texas. The 131st Fighter-Bomber Group was composed of the 110th Fighter Squadron, the 192d Fighter Squadron (Nevada ANG), the 178th Fighter Squadron (North Dakota ANG), and the 170th Fighter Squadron (Illinois ANG). At Berstrom, its mission was a filler replacement for the 27th Fighter-Escort Group which was deployed to Japan as part of SAC's commitment to the Korean War.

The unit was at Bergstrom until November when it was transferred to Tactical Air Command (TAC) and moved to George AFB, California. At George, the unit was scheduled to be re-equipped with F-84D Thunderjets and was programmed for deployment to Japan, however the F-84s were instead sent to France and the 131st Fighter-Bomber Wing remained in California and flew its F-51 Mustangs for the remainder of its federal service. The 110th Fighter-Bomber Squadron was released from active duty and returned to Missouri state control on 1 December 1952.

==== Tactical Air Command ====
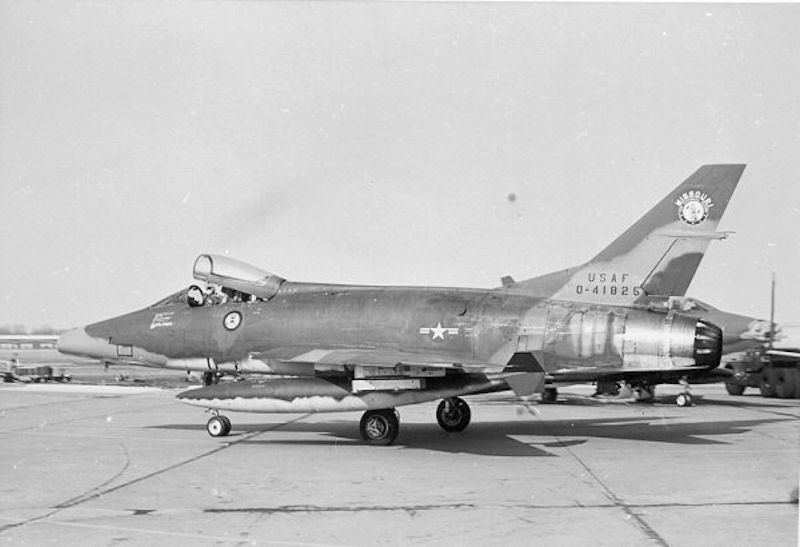
110th TFS F-100C 54-1825, about 1965

Returning to Lambert Field, the 131st was re-formed as a light bombardment squadron in January 1953 and came under Tactical Air Command. It received B-26 Invaders that returned from the Korean War and trained primarily in night bombardment missions, which the aircraft specialized in while in Korea.

With the removal of the B-26 from bombing duties in 1957 as they neared the end of their service lives, the 110th entered the "Jet Age." The 110th received its first jet aircraft in the spring of 1957 when it received some F-80 Shooting Stars, then in June 1957, it transitioned to the F-84F Thunderstreak fighter-bomber.

On 1 October 1961, as a result of the 1961 Berlin Crisis, the mobilized Missouri Air National Guard 131st Tactical Fighter Wing deployed to Toul-Rosières Air Base, France as the 7131st Tactical Fighter Wing (Provisional). When activated as the 7131st TFW, it consisted of the 110, 169 and 170 TFS, from Lambert Field, St. Louis MO, Peoria Municipal Airport, Peoria IL, and Capitol Airport, Springfield IL, respectively. The designation 7131st was used as the Wing, composed of three federalized ANG squadrons, only deployed the 110th Tactical Fighter Squadron to France. The 169th and 170th TFS rotated personnel to Toul during their period of activation due to budget restraints, however only one squadron's worth of aircraft and personnel were at Toul at any one time.

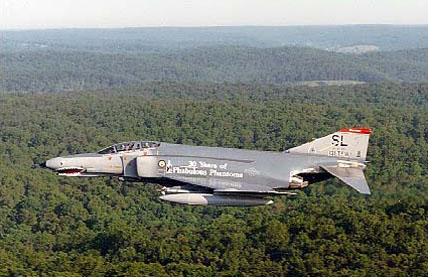
F-4E "30 Years of Phabulous Phantoms".

While in France, guardsmen assumed regular commitments on a training basis with the U.S. 7th Army as well as maintaining a 24-hour alert status. The 7131st exchanged both air and ground crews with the Royal Danish Air Force's 730th Tactical Fighter Squadron at Skydstrup Air Station, Denmark, during the month of May 1962. As the Berlin situation subsided, all activated ANG units were ordered to be returned to the United States and released from active duty. The 7131st TFW was inactivated in place in France on 19 July 1962, and left its aircraft and equipment to USAFE.

After returning to St. Louis, the unit was re-equipped with F-100C Super Sabres in late 1962. It trained with the F-100s for the next 17 years, and upgraded to the improved F-100D in 1971. Although not activated during the Vietnam War, many of the squadron's pilots were sent to F-100 squadrons in South Vietnam between 1968 and 1971. In 1977, Charles Lindbergh's widow gave permission to designate 110th Tactical Fighter Squadron as "Lindbergh's Own.".

In 1978, the unit acquired the "home grown" McDonnell Douglas F-4C Phantom II, the aircraft primarily associated with the Vietnam War. It again upgraded to the more advanced F-4E Phantom II in 1985, and in 1991 was again upgraded to the F-15A/B Eagle air superiority aircraft with the retirement of the F-4s. The 131st was one of the last Air National Guard units to convert to the F-15.

==== Air Combat Command ====
More than 500 members from the 131st Fighter Wing and the tenant units located at Lambert International Airport were called into service to battle the Great Flood of 1993. In the post-Cold War era, the unit deployed to Incirlik AB, Turkey in support of Operation Northern Watch in 1996, 1997 and 1998.

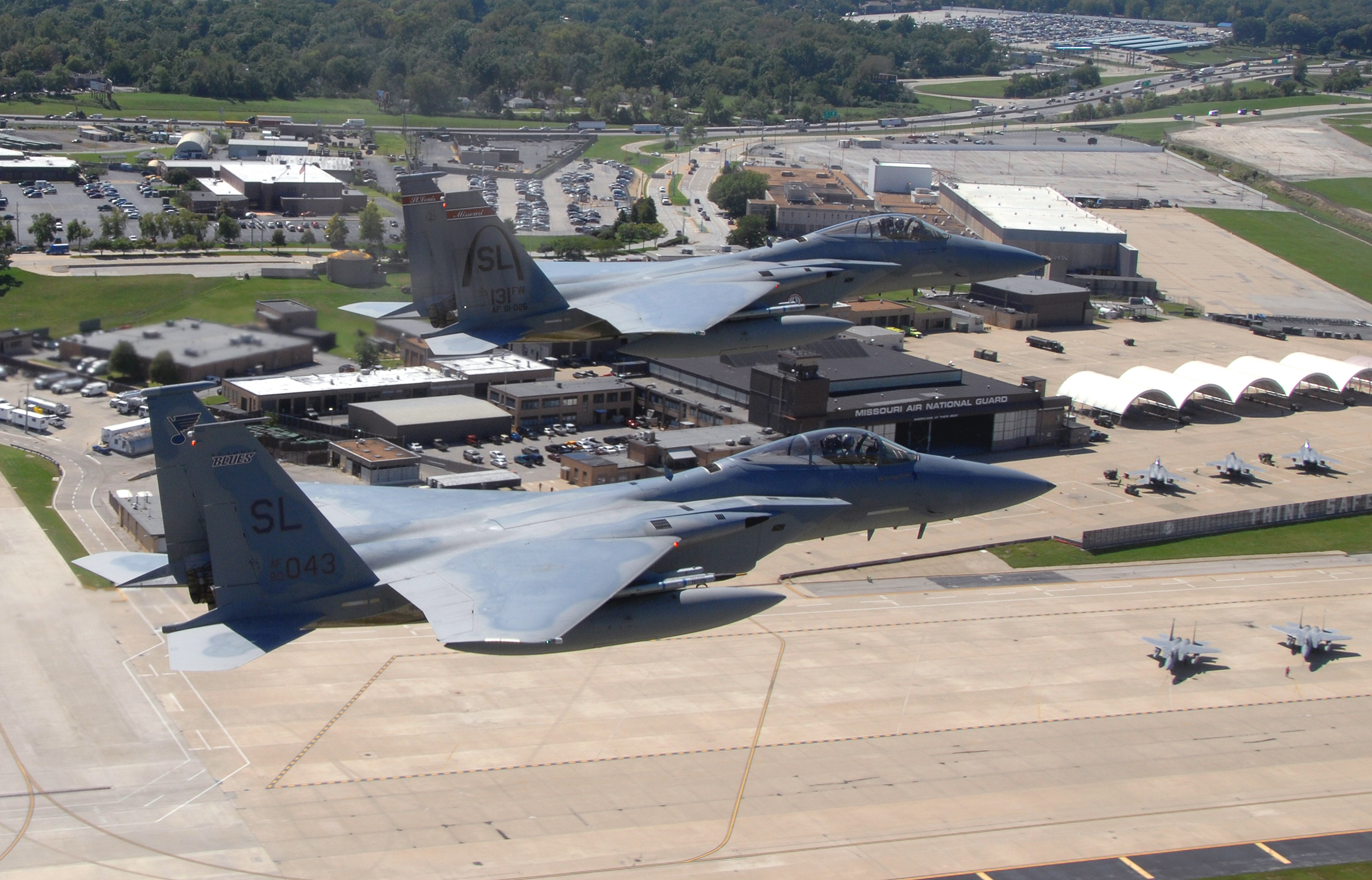
110th FS F-15Cs St Louis 2008

Members of the 131st returned in October 2000 from duty rotations in Southwest Asia and Europe, while other unit members were still stationed overseas. Eventually, a total of about 430 wing members were scheduled to deploy, with the majority leaving in October 2000 for Prince Sultan AB, Saudi Arabia, in support of Operation Southern Watch. A little more than half of the deployed 131st Fighter Wing members and 12 F-15s made up the AEF-9's 110th Expeditionary Fighter Squadron (EFS). The 110th EFS primarily provides air superiority for Operation Southern Watch. AEF-9 was deployed from September through November 2000. In 2004, the improved F-15C Eagle arrived, replacing the older aircraft.

On 16 March 2006, the Air Force announced that elements of the 131st Fighter Wing would become an associate unit assigned to the active duty 509th Bomb Wing. Consequently, the 131st Fighter Wing transitioned from flying and maintaining the F-15C Eagle fighter to the B-2 Spirit bomber. The final flight of the F-15C Eagle by the 131st occurred in June 2009 from Lambert International Airport in St. Louis. The unit was redesignated as the 131st Bomb Wing on 1 October 2008. The 509th and the 131st joined forces according to what is known as a "classic associate wing" structure. In a classic association, the active duty 509th retains ownership of the operational assets, including aircraft, maintenance facilities, and so on. However, each wing maintains its own chain-of-command and organizational structure, while the members of each unit perform their duties in a fully integrated manner. As a result, active duty and Air National Guard pilots and maintainers fly B-2 missions and sustain the aircraft as though they were one unit.

On the morning of Wednesday, 30 May 2007, a Missouri Air National Guard F-15 pilot ejected safely from his aircraft just before it crashed during a training mission in rural Knox county, Indiana. The plane went down just before 11 am EDT south of Vincennes, near the Illinois border, as it conducted standard training maneuvers, according to a release from the National Guard. Investigators said the plane was flying at about 20,000 feet prior to the crash. The pilot had been with the 131st Fighter Wing for 12 years and was highly experienced, officials said. The unit had most recently enforced no-fly zones in Iraq. This crash decreased the 131st's aircraft strength from 20 to 19.

On 2 November 2007, another F-15C from the 131st crashed in Mark Twain National Forest near Boss, Missouri. No property was damaged and no people on the ground were hurt, however the pilot broke an arm and a shoulder, despite ejecting from the plane. The pilot also was said to be in "shock" by the landowners who found him. After investigation, the crash was attributed to a flaw in a part of the plane's fuselage; this led to all F-15 aircraft being grounded between November and January 2008. After the accidents, the 131st's flights were reduced, which was also due to the wing's transition to flying B-2s.

In its 2005 BRAC recommendations, the Department of Defense recommended realignment of the 131st Fighter Wing. The 110th's F-15s (15 aircraft) were to be distributed to the 57th Wing, Nellis Air Force Base, Nevada (nine aircraft), and 177th Fighter Wing, Atlantic City International Airport AGS, New Jersey (six aircraft). The BRAC distribution recommendation to New Jersey was later rescinded and the 177th Fighter Wing remained equipped with F-16 aircraft. Following F-15 divestment, the 131st moved to Whiteman Air Force Base, Missouri and became the first Air National Guard B-2 Spirit bomb wing.

The F-15s began to leave Lambert on 15 August 2008, and by January 2009 most of the 13 remaining aircraft were in the main hangar being stripped of markings. The final two F-15Cs departed on 13 June 2009 after a closing ceremony titled "The End of an Era," which was attended by over 2,000 people. Some pilots had already begun B-2 training, while others chose to move to different units or retire early. The 131st Fighter Wing was the most experienced F-15 Fighter Wing in the United States; out of the four pilots that flew over 4,000 F-15 flight hours, three of them were from the unit.

==== Global Strike Command ====
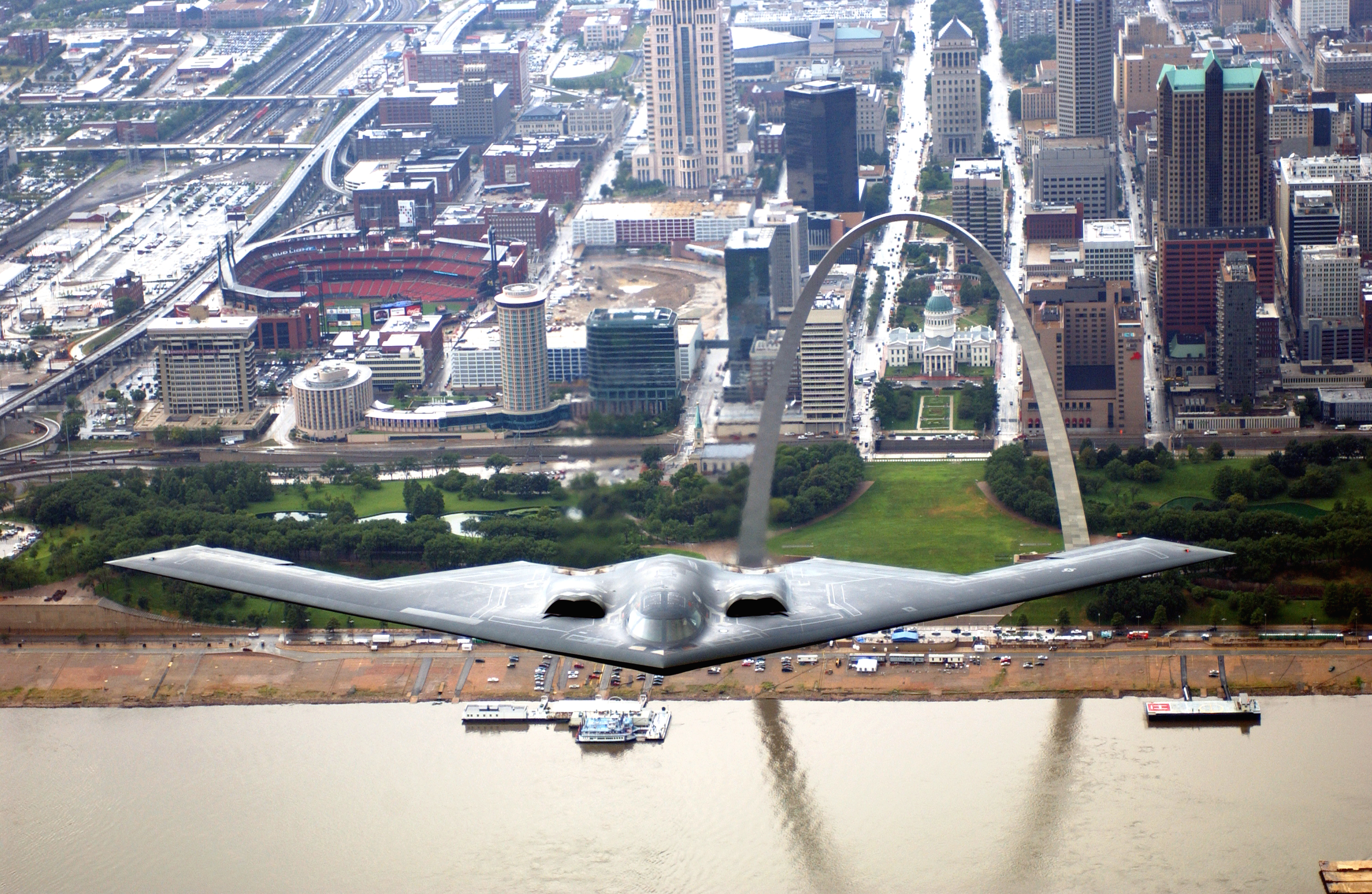
B-2 Spirit from Whiteman Air Force Base over St. Louis, the former home of the 131st Bomb Wing.

The 131st Bomb Wing's transition to Air Force Global Strike Command occurred on 4 October 2008 when the 131st Bomb Wing held a ribbon-cutting ceremony at Whiteman AFB. The ceremony celebrated the first official drill for traditional guardsmen at Whiteman and the grand opening of building 3006, the 131st Bomb Wing's first headquarters there. On 16 June 2009, the last F-15 departed Lambert Field.

In August 2013, the 131st Bomb Wing was deemed fully mission-capable, meaning that it fully completed the transition to Whiteman Air Force Base.

During the Twelve-Day War, the 131st Bomb Wing was tasked to participate in Operation Midnight Hammer, the largest operational deployment of the B-2 Spirit in U.S. Air Force history. On the night of 12–13 June 2025, Missouri Air National Guard Airmen flew alongside active-duty counterparts from the 509th Bomb Wing in a coordinated strike against Iranian nuclear development facilities.

Operation Midnight Hammer marked the first time the Air National Guard directly participated in a nuclear-deterrence strike package of this scale.

== Lineage ==
- Established as the 131st Composite Wing and allotted to the Air National Guard on 31 October 1950

Organized and received federal recognition on 1 November 1950
Redesignated 131st Fighter Wing on 1 February 1951
Federalized and placed on active duty on 1 March 1951
Redesignated 131st Fighter-Bomber Wing on 9 April 1951
Released from active duty and returned to Missouri state control on 1 December 1952
Redesignated 131st Bombardment Wing, Light on 1 December 1952
Redesignated 131st Bombardment Wing, Tactical in 1955
Redesignated 131st Tactical Fighter Wing (Special Delivery) on 1 January 1960
Redesignated 131st Tactical Fighter Wing on 1 January 1960
Federalized and placed on active duty on 1 October 1961
Released from active duty and returned to Missouri state control on 31 August 1962
Redesignated 131st Fighter Wing on 15 March 1992
Redesignated 131st Bomb Wing on 4 October 2008

=== Assignments ===
- Missouri Air National Guard, 1 November 1950
- Tenth Air Force, 1 March 1951
- Eighth Air Force, 9 April 1951
- Fifteenth Air Force, 7 August 1951
- Tactical Air Command, 16 November 1951 – 1 December 1952
- Missouri Air National Guard, 1 December 1952
- United States Air Forces in Europe, 1 October 1961
- Missouri Air National Guard, 31 August 1962 – present

=== Components ===
==== Air National Guard ====
- 131st Composite Group (later 131st Fighter Group, Fighter-Bomber Group, Bombardment Group, Tactical Fighter Group, Operations Group), 1 November 1950 – 1 December 1952, 1 December 1952 – 1 November 1958, 1 October 1962 – 30 September 1974, 15 March 1992 – Present
- 133d Air Transport Group, 1 November 1950 – 1 March 1951 (Minnesota ANG)
- 110th Tactical Fighter Squadron (later, 110th Fighter Squadron, 110th Bomb Squadron), 1 November 1958 – 1 October 1962, 30 September 1974 – 1 January 1993
- 117th Fighter-Interceptor Squadron (later 117th Tactical Reconnaissance Squadron), 1 November 1958 – 15 October 1962 (Kansas ANG)
- 127th Tactical Fighter Squadron, 1 November 1958 – 1 October 1962 (Kansas ANG)
- 180th Tactical Reconnaissance Squadron, 1 November 1958 – 14 April 1962 (GSU St. Joseph, MO)

=== Stations ===
- Lambert Field, Missouri, 1 November 1950

Bergstrom Air Force Base, Texas, 1 March 1951
George Air Force Base, California, July 1951 – 1 December 1952

- Lambert Field, Missouri, 1 December 1952

Operated from Toul-Rosieres AB, France, 1 October 1961

- Lambert Field (Later Lambert-St. Louis International Airport), Missouri, August 1962

Designated Robertson Air National Guard Base, Missouri, 1991–2008

- Whiteman Air Force Base, Missouri, 4 October 2008 – present

=== Aircraft ===
- F-51D Mustang, 1950–1952
- B-26 Invader, 1950–1957
- F-80 Shooting Star, 1957
- F-84 Thunderjet, 1957–1958
- F-84F Thunderstreak, 1957–1962
- F-100C/F Super Sabre, 1962–1971
- F-100D/F Super Sabre, 1971–1979
- F-4C Phantom II, 1979–1985
- F-4E Phantom II, 1985–1991
- F-15A/B Eagle, 1991–2004
- F-15C/D Eagle, 2004–2009
- B-2 Spirit, 2009–present

=== Decorations ===
- Air Force Outstanding Unit Award 31 October 2011 to 31 October 2013
