= Puerto Rico State Guard =

State defense force of Puerto Rico

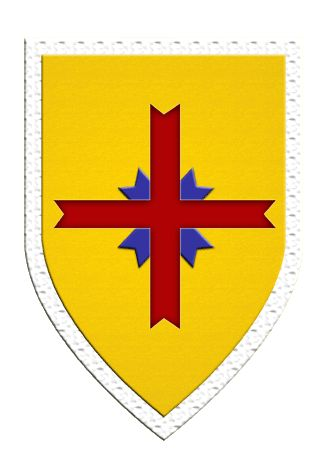
- Shoulder sleeve insignia
- Active: 1942–1946; 1971–present
- Country: United States
- Allegiance: Puerto Rico
- Type: State defense force
- Role: Military support to civil authorities
- Size: 1,500 soldiers and airmen (Note: Vicens (2012; in Spanish): "Además, contamos con aproximadamente 1,500 soldados en el Comando Estatal, que le sirven voluntariamente al pueblo de Puerto Rico.")
- Part of: Puerto Rico National Guard

Commanders
- Commander-in-Chief: Governor Jenniffer González-Colón
- Commander: BG Edrick Ramirez Gonzalez

Insignia
- Beret flash of the Puerto Rico State Guard

The Puerto Rico State Guard (PRSG; Spanish: Guardia Estatal de Puerto Rico) is the state defense force of Puerto Rico that operates under the sole authority of the governor of Puerto Rico who, in turn, delegates such authority to the Puerto Rico Adjutant General. The Guard's secondary purpose is to assume the state mission of the Puerto Rico National Guard in the event that the National Guard is mobilized. The first incarnation of the PRSG was created in 1942 in response to World War II and it disbanded in 1946. The PRSG was revived in 1971 and has remained in continuous existence since then. It is one of the few state defense forces of the United States that has an air division.

== Overview ==
The PRSG is a voluntary professional military corps and one of the Major Subordinate Commands of the Puerto Rico Military Forces, which includes the Puerto Rico Army National Guard and the Puerto Rico Air National Guard (PRANG). The PRSG responds directly to the Adjutant General of Puerto Rico, is commanded by a brigadier general and is composed of main units in the San Juan metropolitan area and the cities of Ponce (South), Mayagüez (West), Caguas (Center), and Ceiba (East). The PRSG is among the most active and largest of the country's state defense forces (SDFs) with almost 1,500 troops organized into six support groups, a separate SAR company, a military academy, an air base group and HHQs.

SDFs (also known as state guards, state military reserves, or state militias) in the US are military units that operate under the sole authority of a state government and are partially regulated by the National Guard Bureau. Their constitutional authority is given in Article I, section 8 of the US Constitution, which endorses the existence and potential value of the army, navy, and militia, and establishes basic roles for federal and state governments with respect to their administration and operation. However, Article I, section 10 of the Constitution prohibits states from maintaining state guards in times of peace, without the express consent of Congress. Provisions for states to maintain SDFs are outlined in section 109, title 32 of the United States Code (32 U.S.C. § 109 [2013]). Initially established by Congress in the early 20th century and authorized in their current form in 1955, there are active SDFs in 19 states and Puerto Rico as of February 2024. SDFs are authorized by state and federal law and are under the command of the governor of each state. The US Congress recognized the need for governors and States to keep military troops even if the President calls the state National Guard for federal military service. For that reason, Congress authorizes the SDFs under Title 32 of the United States Code.

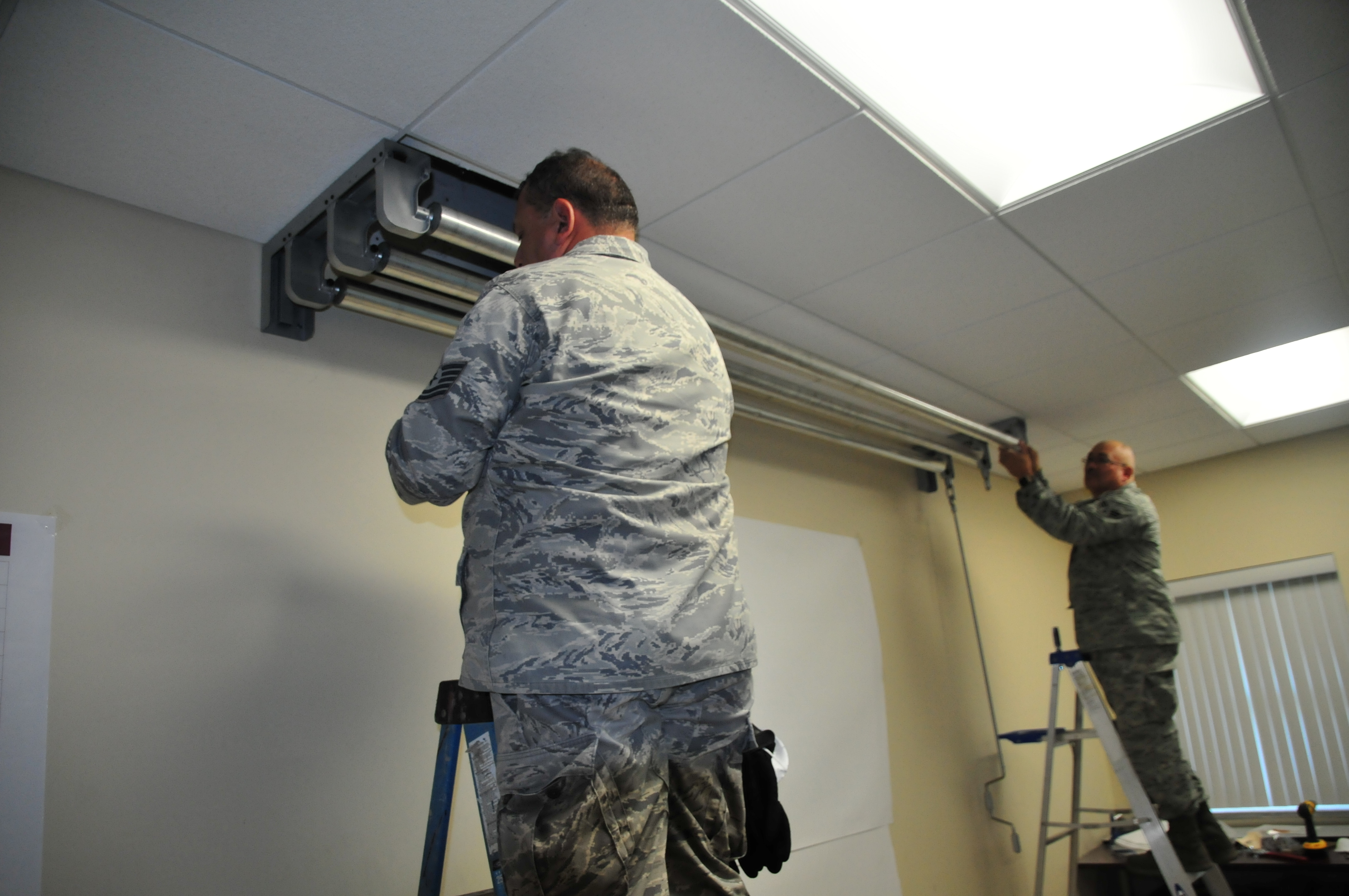
Members of the 1st Air Base Group-Puerto Rico Air State Guard conduct visual inspections and minor repairs to facilities on St. Croix as part of a week-long assignment

The PRSG is the SDF of Puerto Rico and can support Puerto Rico National Guard (PRNG) operations in security, engineering, transportation, chaplaincy, emergency management, legal, and medical services among other operational areas. As part of the PRNG the PRSG is also known as the State Command of the Puerto Rico National Guard.

Along with Texas, California and New York, the PRSG is one of the few SDFs that has an air division. The 1st Air Base Group (1ABG), located at Muñiz Air National Guard Base, is an example of integration and teamwork with PRANG units, especially the 156th Airlift Wing. The 1ABG is composed of a headquarters squadron, a mission support squadron (engineering flight, services flight, personnel flight, security forces flight and firefighter flight), a medical squadron, and a logistic squadron (transportation flight, supply flight and an aerial port flight). Currently, the 1ABG has two support units for the 141st Air Control Squadron in Aguadilla and the 140th Air Defense Squadron in Punta Salinas. All 1ABG units are organized to meet the military training requirements necessary to take over PRANG installations upon mobilization and deployment of their units.

The 1ABG training is conducted in accordance with USAF regulations, which supplement PRSG and PRNG regulations, directives and guidance. Unit Training Assemblies (UTAs) are performed jointly with PRANG's 156th Wing in consolidated drills. These drills allow 1ABG personnel to acquire hands-on experience of what their duties would be if PRANG units were mobilized and deployed. It also allows them to be trained by their counterparts in their specialty.

== History ==
The PRSG considers itself a direct descendant of the Spanish Volunteer Regiments created during the Spanish Colonial period which were later replaced by the US Volunteer Infantry in 1898. With most of the PRNG being activated and mobilized during World War II, a secondary force was proposed to deal with the area of Puerto Rico. On April 13, 1942, the colonial legislature passed Law 28, which approved the creation of a new militia-based program to fill the role of the soldiers that had left. The legislation specified that the placeholder entity would only serve within the borders of Puerto Rico and would have to meet standards similar to the PRNG. Gen. Luis Esteves was responsible for organizing the State Guard, establishing nine Regiments composed of three battalions. Companies were scattered throughout Puerto Rico, under the supervision of experienced Colonels. The role of Judge Advocate was handed to Samuel Quiñones, then president of the colonial senate. Medical and other initiatives were completed with civilian volunteers, including Ramón Suárez. A band, led by Luis Miranda, was also created. The State Guard tried to promote itself in the media, publishing a government-sponsored magazine named Centinela Alerta and a column in the newspaper El Mundo. After the war concluded and the PRNG returned, the State Guard was disbanded. Colonial governor and Gen. Esteves awarded a certificate to all the enlisted men, while those who served at least three years were also given a medal approved by the legislature.

The modern PRSG was reformed in 1976 following the approval of the Military Law of Puerto Rico, and it is considered the state controlled branch of the PRNG. This group was formed to provide Puerto Rico a trained and organized military force in the event of a state security emergency or if the National Guard is deployed. The PRSG is the state's authorized militia and assumes the state mission of the Puerto Rico National Guard in the event the Guard is mobilized. The PRSG comprises retired, active with, and reserve military personnel and selected professional persons who volunteer their time and talents in further service to their state.

The PRSG was mobilised to assist dealing with the COVID-19 pandemic in Puerto Rico alongside the Puerto Rico National Guard and civilian authorities and services.

== Role ==
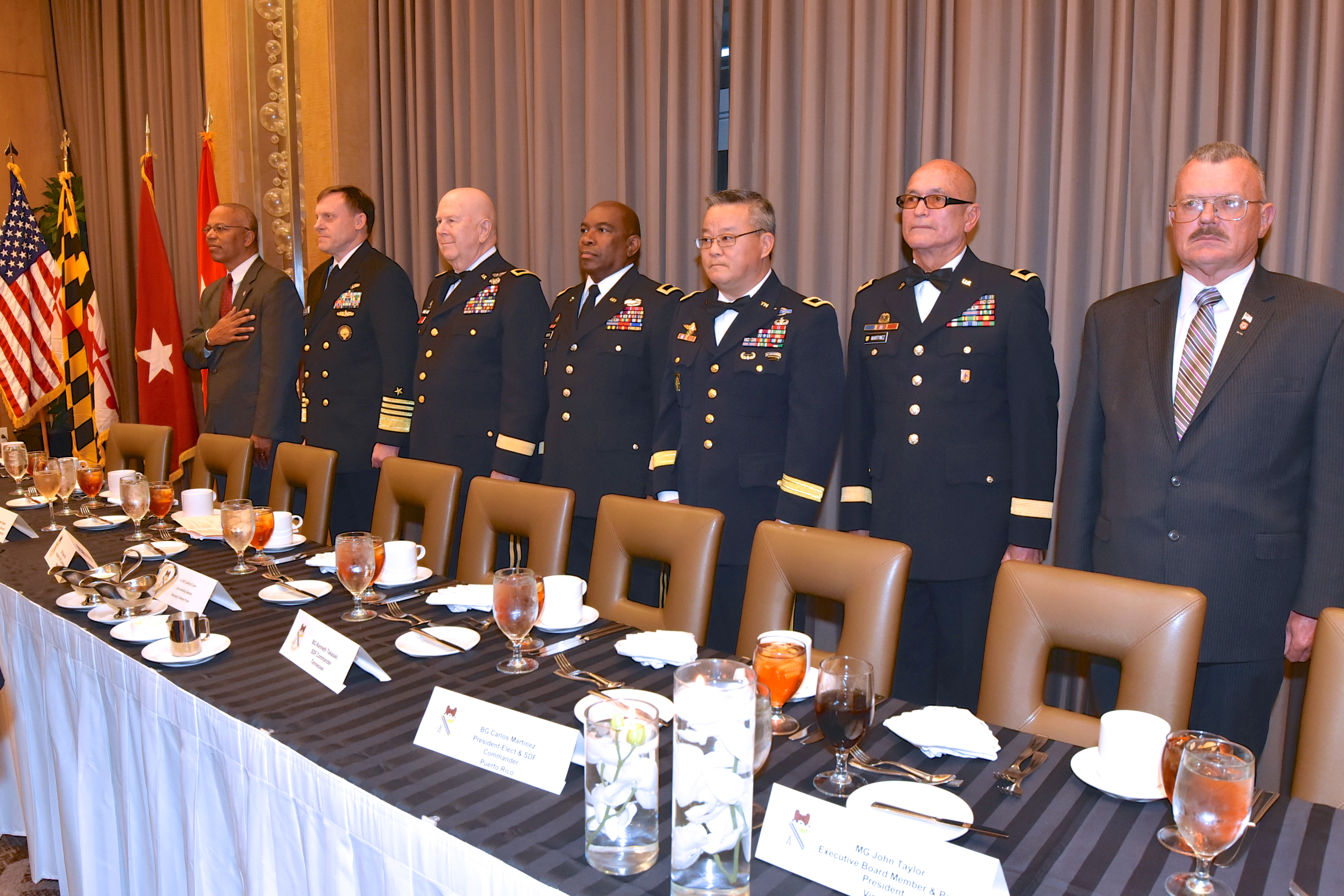
Brigadier General Carlos M. Martínez, commander of the Puerto Rico State Guard, second from right, attends a State Guard Association conference in October 2015

The task of the PRSG is to support the PRNG when the latter is activated by the Governor of Puerto Rico or called to active service by the President of the United States. The PRSG also represents the PRNG in civic activities, and supports it in cases of emergencies.

With the approved resources, the PRSG is able to recruit and train personnel to provide security and defense with the armories, as well as assist civilian authorities in cases of natural disasters, emergencies, and serious disturbances of public order. These volunteers offer support and provide services to the community through health clinics.

In the PRSG, there is a large representation of veterans with extensive combat and command experience as well as non-priors with significant professional and paramilitary backgrounds which greatly enhances the organization. A large proportion of PRSG soldiers are active members of the State Guard Association of the United States (SGAUS) and a few senior officers and NCOs hold leadership positions in the organization.

The PRSG has been an active force for the PRNG, supporting Federal mobilizations (legal and medical support), and its current mission is to assist the National Guard especially in concern to homeland security and SAR duties (natural disasters, civil disturbances, communities service and facilities management).

The PRSG is the state's authorized militia and assumes the state mission of the Puerto Rico National Guard in the event the Guard is mobilized. The PRSG comprises retired, active and reserve military personnel and selected professional persons who volunteer their time and talents in further service to their state.

As a state organized militia, the PRSG ranks are official state military ranks in accordance with Article 1, Section 8, Clause 16 of the United States Constitution was the US Congress received the power "to provide for organizing, arming, and disciplining, the Militia, and for governing such Part of them as may be employed in the Service of the United States, reserving to the States respectively, the Appointment of the Officers, and the Authority of training the Militia according to the discipline prescribed by Congress". All PRSG appointments, commissions, warrants, and enlistments are recognized and authorized by the Governor of Puerto Rico through the Adjutant General of PR. The PRSG military personnel render to all members of the military community, and receive from them, all courtesies common to all such members, such as saluting, and forms of address.

Unlike the Civil Air Patrol or the United States Coast Guard Auxiliary, the PRSG is a statutory military entity of the Commonwealth of Puerto Rico with each PRSG member subject to the Uniform Code of Military Justice (UCMJ) per the Military Code of Puerto Rico. Under state law, enlisted members and officers of the PRSG have the same similar legal status, privileges, and /or immunities as members of the state National Guard (in state status) when called to State Active Duty (SAD) or in a drill status.

Generally, the PRSG soldiers and airmen are not paid for drills, UTAs, or annual training. However, because the PRSG is a state military force, members are subject to a call to state active duty by the governor. When that happens, PRSG members are paid at the same rate of pay for their rank or grade as their National Guard counterparts. The Governor of Puerto Rico may provide for the use of the forces of Puerto Rico State Guard barracks, weapons, and equipment from the National Guard of Puerto Rico as are not in current use by that body, as well as available buildings and public properties. The Governor may request the Secretary of the Army of the United States to provide to the Puerto Rico State Guard all the weapons and equipment that could be provided to these forces by the Department of the Army of the United States.

Like other State Defense Forces, the PRSG is not eligible for federal service. However, 10 USC 331-333 may grant powers to the federal government to call up the PRSG since militia is defined as both organized (National Guard) and unorganized under 10 USC 311(b). In addition, Article II, Section II of the United States Constitution further states: "The President shall be commander in chief of the Army and Navy of the United States, and of the militia of the several states, when called into the actual service of the United States."

As stated by the Department of Defense (DoD) Inspector General in the 2014 Evaluation of Department of Defense Interaction with State Defense Forces Report: "Accordingly, as a state organization, the SDF (PRSG members) would not be eligible for Federal benefits, such as pensions and access to the Federal military healthcare system. However, this prohibition did not prohibit DoD from sharing with the SDF (PRSG) any equipment or other resources acquired with Federal funds, providing it furthers DoD missions."

The law also grants employment protection to any person who belongs to the Puerto Rico State Guard and who because of it is absent from employment, for State Active Duty or training.

This major command was formed to provide Puerto Rico with a trained and organized military force in the event of a state security emergency or if the National Guard is deployed. The PRSG comprises retired, active and reserve military personnel and selected professional persons who volunteer their time and talents in further service to their state.

The PRSG is organized in the following subordinate units:

Army Component
- Multifunctional Support Brigade
- Service & Support Battalion
- Military Police Battalion
- Engineering Battalion
- Military Band
- R & R Detachment
- Military Institute
- MEPS
- Strategic Communications Detachment

Air Guard

- Medical Squadron
- Mission Support Squadron
- Security Forces Flight
- Logistics Flight
- Civil Engineer Flight
- Sustainment Flight

Medical Command

- Area Support Medical Company
- Mobile Clinic
- Field Hospital

The PRSG Military Institute offers specialized and general training to its soldiers. Some examples of training offered either at state or local levels include:

- Initial Entry Training Course
- Basic and Advanced Non Commissioned Officer Training
- Basic and Advanced Officer Training
- Basic Marksmanship Training
- Community Emergency Response Team (CERT) given in concert with FEMA and DHS
- Military Emergency Management Specialist (MEMS) Certification
- Marksmanship Training Unit that has represented the PRNG in multiple rifle and pistol competitions

== Structure ==
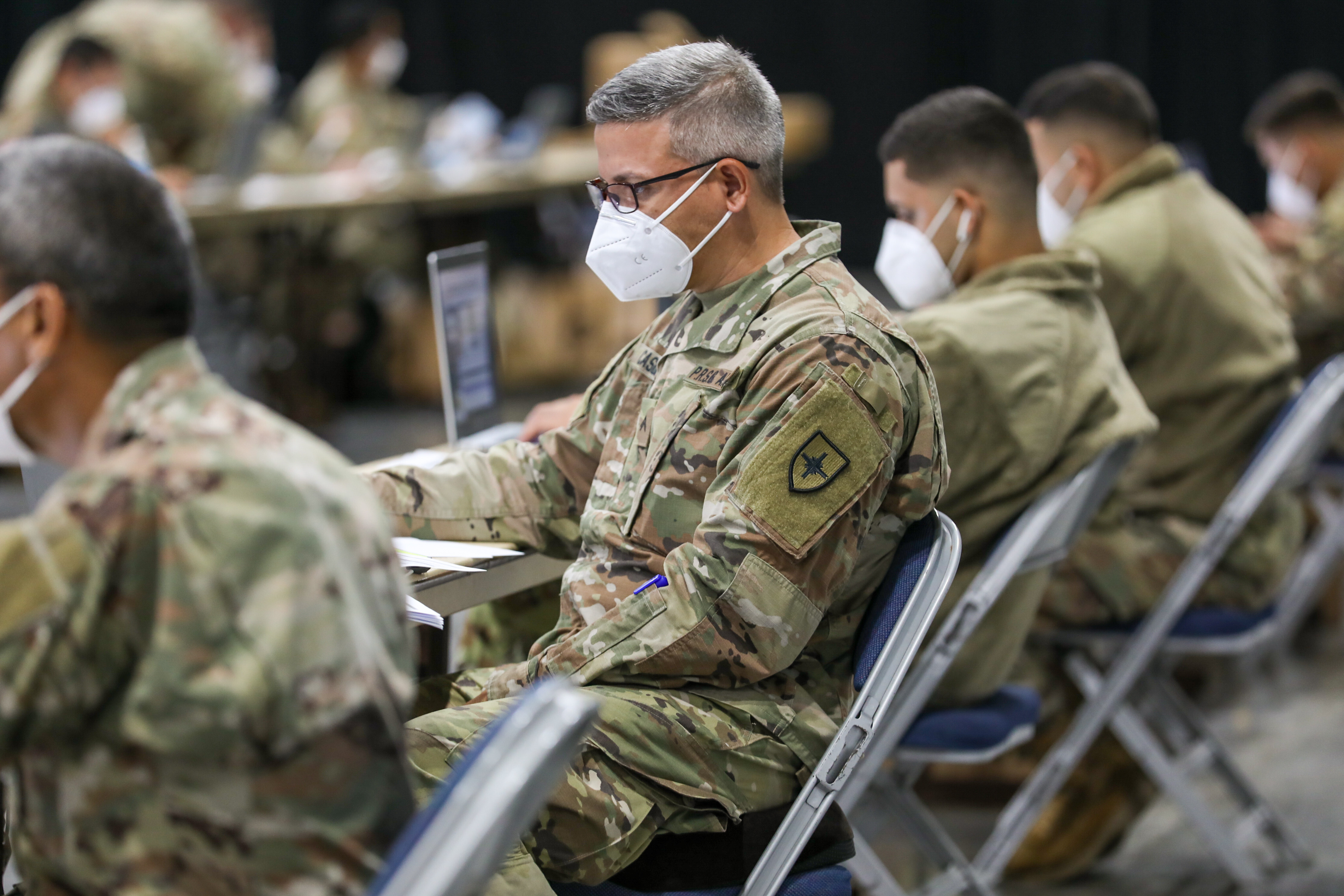
A Puerto Rico State Guard soldier verifies vaccine information in San Juan, Puerto Rico during the COVID-19 pandemic

- Executive branch of the government of Puerto Rico and National Guard Bureau
  - Puerto Rico National Guard
    - Puerto Rico State Guard
      - 1st Army Support Group
      - 2nd Army Support Group
      - 3rd Army Support Group
      - 4th Army Support Group
      - 1st Air Base Group
      - 1st Medical Group
      - 1st Engineering Group
      - Search & Rescue Company
      - Military Academy

== See also ==
- Military history of Puerto Rico
- Puerto Rico Wing Civil Air Patrol
- State Guard Association of the United States
- 1st Air Base Group
