= 110th Bomb Squadron =

Missouri Air National Guard unit

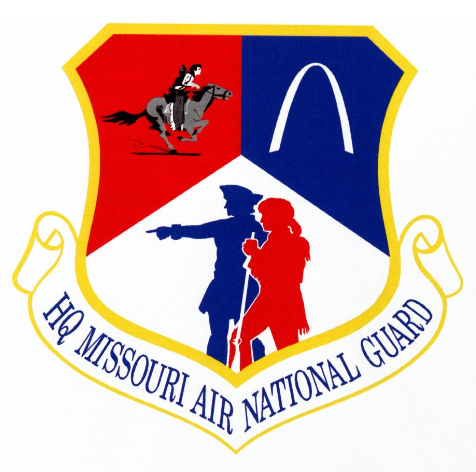
110th Bomb Squadron

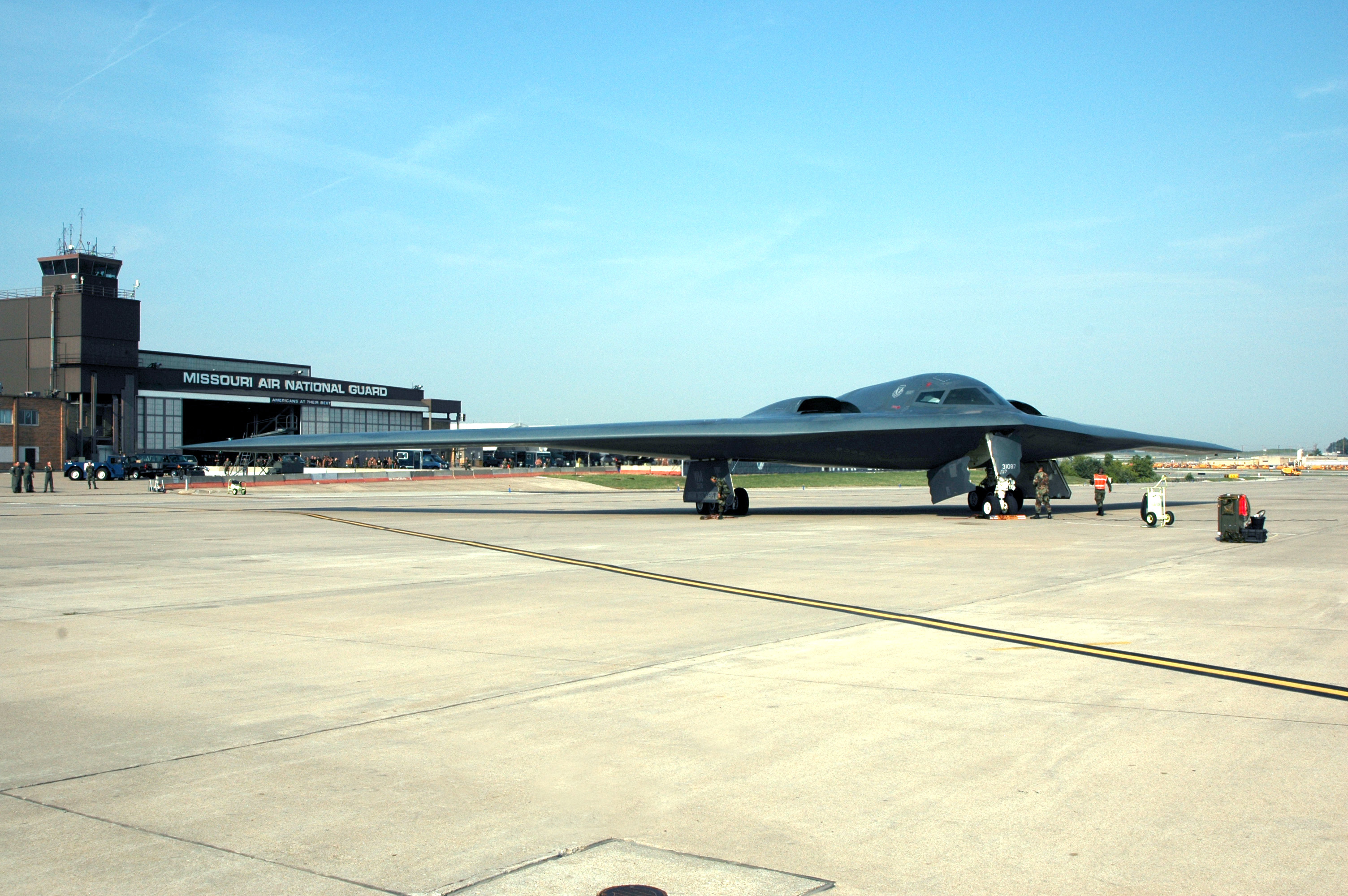
- B-2 Spirit stealth bomber operated by the 110th Bomb Squadron
- Active: 1917–1919; 1923–1946; 1946–1953; 1953–present
- Country: United States
- Allegiance: Missouri
- Branch: Air National Guard
- Role: Strategic bombardment
- Part of: Missouri Air National Guard
- Garrison/HQ: Whiteman Air Force Base, Missouri
- Nickname: "Lindbergh's Own"
- Mascots: Banjo, the Missouri Mule
- Engagements: World War I Southwest Pacific Theater; Operation Northern Watch; Operation Odyssey Dawn; Operation Odyssey Lightning; Operation Poseidon Archer; Operation Rough Rider; Operation Midnight Hammer
- Decorations: Distinguished Unit Citation Philippine Presidential Unit Citation Governor's Citation

Insignia
- 110th Bomb Squadron Emblem (Note: Approved 7 July 1949. The designation on the scroll has been updated to reflect the unit's redesignation.)

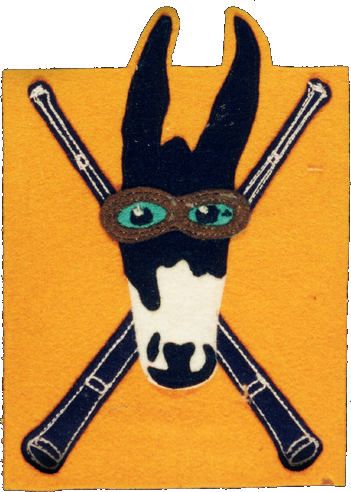
- 110th Observation Squadron emblem
- Tail codes: SL (198? – June 2009); WM (2009 – present)

The 110th Bomb Squadron is a unit of the Missouri Air National Guard 131st Bomb Wing located at Whiteman Air Force Base, Missouri. The 110th is equipped with the Northrop Grumman B-2 Spirit.

The 110 BS is the oldest unit in the Missouri Air National Guard, with over 90 years of service to the state and nation. It is a descendant organization of the World War I 110th Aero Squadron, established on 14 August 1917. It was reformed on 23 June 1923, as the 110th Observation Squadron, and is one of the 29 original National Guard Observation Squadrons of the United States Army National Guard formed before World War II.

The 131st Bomb Wing, of which the 110th Bomb Squadron is a part, is the only Air National Guard wing certified to conduct nuclear operations.

== History ==
=== World War I ===
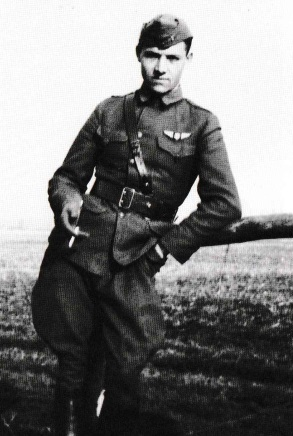
Slonnie Sloniger at Issoudun Aerodrome in France, WWI

Established at Kelly Field, Texas in August 1917 as the 110th Aero Squadron. Constructed facilities and engaged in supply and related base support activities. Later redesignated 804th Aero Squadron (1 February 1918), then Squadron K, Kelly Field in July 1918. Demobilized 1918 shortly after the Armistice with Germany.

=== Missouri National Guard ===
The squadron was constituted on 23 June 1923, with the immediate organization of the 110th Observation Squadron, 35th Division Air Service, Missouri National Guard. The squadron's first headquarters was located in a filling station on Manchester Avenue. From there it was moved to a small room over a grocery store on Olive Street Road in St. Louis County. Meetings were held at the local airport, then little more than a pasture, and there were no airplanes and no uniforms for the enlisted men. The squadron's original authorized officer strength was one major, five captains, eleven first lieutenants and fourteen second lieutenants, for a total of thirty-one. In its early years, the squadron had only about half of its authorized officer strength. The squadron's first commanding officer was Major William B. Robertson.

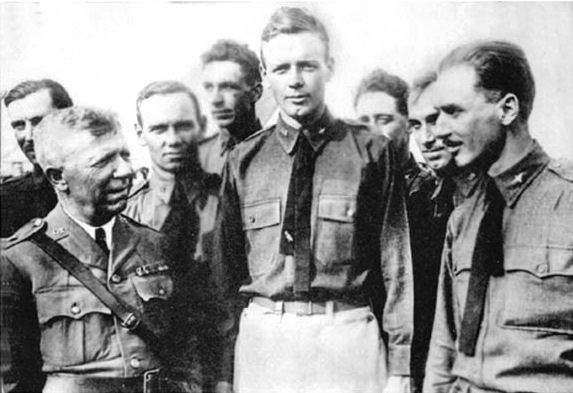
Captain Charles A. Lindbergh, Missouri National Guard, and members of his National Guard unit, 110th Observation Squadron, after he flew solo across the Atlantic Ocean, 1927.

The squadron's first plane was a Curtiss JN-4 "Jenny", which was purchased by the officers of the squadron and used for flight training until early 1924 when three surplus wartime JN-4's were received from the Militia Bureau. The planes were housed in a corrugated sheet metal hangar erected on the field during the National Air Races in 1923 and later turned over to the squadron. Additional aircraft and equipment were received throughout 1924, and by the year's end, a well received training program was in effect. Only eighteen months had elapsed since the unit was formally organized.

During the next few years the JN-4's were replaced by the Consolidated PT-1 Trusty, Consolidated TW-3, Curtiss O-11, and Douglas O-2H aircraft and the unit assumed a mission of observation and reconnaissance. Their chief pilot on the "St. Louis to Chicago" airmail run was a young man named Charles Lindbergh. Lindbergh became a member of the 110th as a 2nd lieutenant on 14 March 1925 and held the rank of captain when he made his historic 1927 Trans-Atlantic solo flight. Lindbergh remained a member of the squadron until 1929.

In February 1929, the 35th Division Aviation headquarters was disbanded, but the 110th Observation Squadron remained attached to the 35th Division for tactical purposes, being assigned in October 1933 to the 47th Observation Group for command and control purposes. Men, equipment, and unit headquarters consolidated in a new hangar at Lambert Field (now St. Louis Lambert International Airport) in 1931. Summer field training conducted in the 1930s allowed 110th members to hone their skills on the K-17 aerial camera. The Douglas O-38 aircraft was received in 1933 and replaced in 1938 by the North American O-47A, an all-metal mid-wing observation aircraft.

The unit's first summer encampments were held in 1924 and 1925 at Camp Clark, near Nevada, Missouri. Subsequent encampments were at Fort Riley, Kansas; Lambert Field; Eglin Field, Florida; Fort Sill, Oklahoma; and St. Cloud, Minnesota. Detachments were also sent many years to support the summer training of the Missouri National Guard's 203rd Coast Artillery Regiment at Fort Barrancas, Florida, and the units of the 35th Division's 60th Field Artillery Brigade at Fort Riley and Fort Sill. In April 1934, the squadron provided aerial surveillance of, and for, the 7th Cavalry Brigade (Mechanized) during its movement from Fort Knox, Kentucky, to Fort Riley.

=== World War II ===
The Guardsmen were ordered into active service on 23 December 1940 as part of the buildup of the Army Air Corps after the Fall of France. The unit was sent to Little Rock, Arkansas and initially flew antisubmarine patrols over the Gulf of Mexico. After the attack on Pearl Harbor, the squadron was sent to California where it flew patrols over the Southern California coast again performing antisubmarine patrols.

In early 1943, it was assigned to Third Air Force and trained as a combat reconnaissance unit, being equipped with a mixture of photo-recon A-20 Havocs and B-25 Mitchells. Was deployed to Fifth Air Force in the Southwest Pacific in the fall of 1943 and flew reconnaissance missions over New Britain, New Guinea, and the Admiralty Islands from bases in New Guinea and Biak. Reinforced with armed P-40 and P-39 fighters, it also flew combat mission against Japanese installations, airfields, and shipping, while supporting Allied ground forces on New Guinea and Biak. During that time, it flew courier missions, participated in rescue operations, and hauled passengers and cargo. From November 1944, the group flew reconnaissance missions over Luzon, supported ground forces, photographed and bombed airfields in Formosa and China, and attacked enemy shipping in the South China Sea. A Distinguished Unit Citation awarded for the 26 December 1944 attack on aJapanese Naval Task Force. In all, the unit destroyed 122 aircraft and 11 ships.

At the end of the war, the 110th Tactical Reconnaissance Squadron moved to Japan and was part of the occupation forces. It was inactivated in early 1946.

=== Missouri Air National Guard ===
The 110th Tactical Reconnaissance Squadron was redesignated the 110th Fighter Squadron, and allotted to the National Guard on 24 May 1946. It was organized at Lambert Field and extended federal recognition on 1 January 1947. The 119th Fighter Squadron was equipped with F-51D Mustang fighters and assigned to the Missouri ANG 131st Fighter Group. Its mission was the air defense of St Louis and the state of Missouri.

==== Korean War activation ====
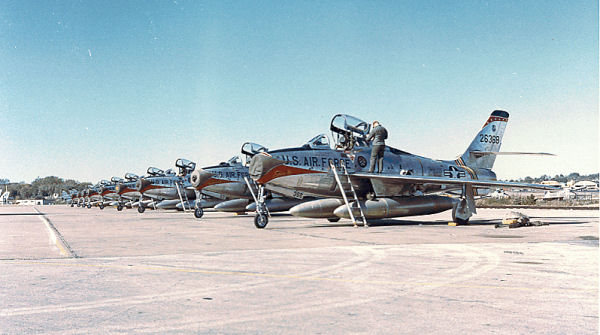
Republic F-84F-30-RE Thunderstreak of the 110th Tactical Fighter Squadron, 131st Tactical Fighter Wing – 1961/62. Serial 52-6368 is in foreground.

On 1 March 1951 the 110th was federalized and brought to active-duty due to the Korean War. It was initially assigned to Strategic Air Command (SAC) and transferred to Bergstrom Air Force Base, Texas and assigned to the Federalized 131st Fighter-Bomber Group. The 131st was composed of the 110th, the 192d Fighter Squadron (Nevada ANG), the 178th Fighter Squadron (North Dakota ANG), and the 170th Fighter Squadron (Illinois ANG). At Bergstrom, its mission was as a filler replacement for the 27th Fighter-Escort Group which was deployed to Japan as part of SAC's commitment to the Korean War.

The unit was at Bergstrom until November when it was transferred to Tactical Air Command (TAC) and moved to George Air Force Base, California. At George, the unit was scheduled to be re-equipped with F-84D Thunderjets and was programmed for deployment to Japan, however, the F-84s were instead sent to France and the 131st Fighter-Bomber Wing remained in California and flew its F-51 Mustangs for the remainder of its federal service. The 110th Fighter-Bomber Squadron was released from active duty and returned to Missouri's control on 1 January 1953.

==== Tactical Air Command ====
Shortly after its return to Lambert Field, the 110th was reformed as a light bombardment squadron in January 1953 and was moved under TAC. It received B-26 Invaders that returned from the Korean War and trained primarily in night bombardment missions, which the aircraft specialized in while in Korea.

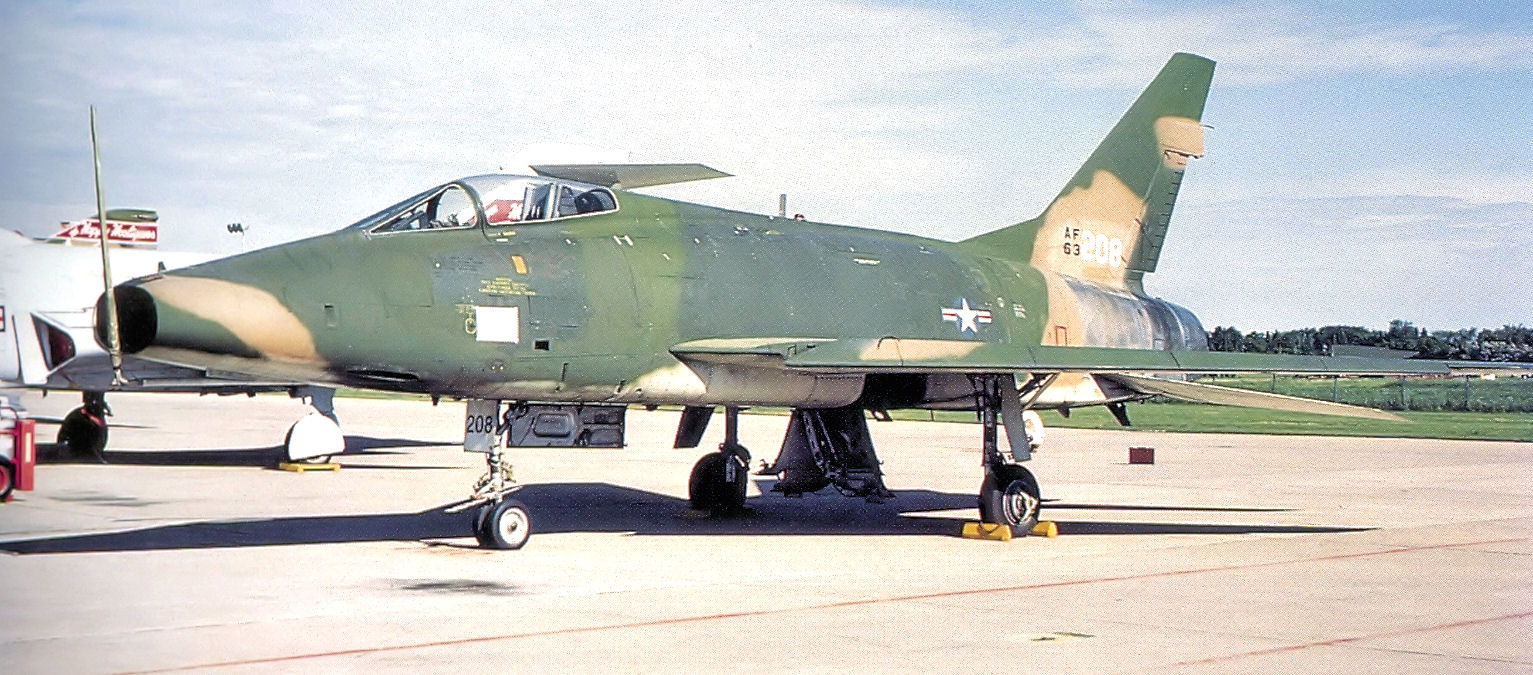
110th Tactical Fighter Squadron F-100D Super Sabre (Note: Aircraft is North American F-100D-90-NA Super Sabre, serial 56-3208 in November 1975.)

With the removal of the B-26 from bombing duties in 1957 as neared the end of their service lives, the 110th entered the Jet Age. The 110th received its first jet aircraft in the spring of 1957 when it received F-80 Shooting Stars. The 110th flew F-80s until June 1957, when it transitioned to the F-84F Thunderstreak fighter-bomber.

On 1 October 1961, as a result of the 1961 Berlin Crisis, the mobilized Missouri Air National Guard 131st Tactical Fighter Wing deployed to Toul-Rosières Air Base, France, forming the 7131st Tactical Fighter Wing. When activated, it consisted of the 110, 169 and 170 TFS, from Lambert Field, St. Louis MO, Peoria Municipal Airport, Peoria IL, and Capitol Airport, Springfield IL, respectively. The wing, composed of three federalized ANG squadrons, only deployed the 110th Tactical Fighter Squadron to France. The 169th and 170th TFS rotated personnel to Toul-Rosières during their period of activation due to budget restraints, however only one squadron's worth of aircraft and personnel were at Toul at any one time.

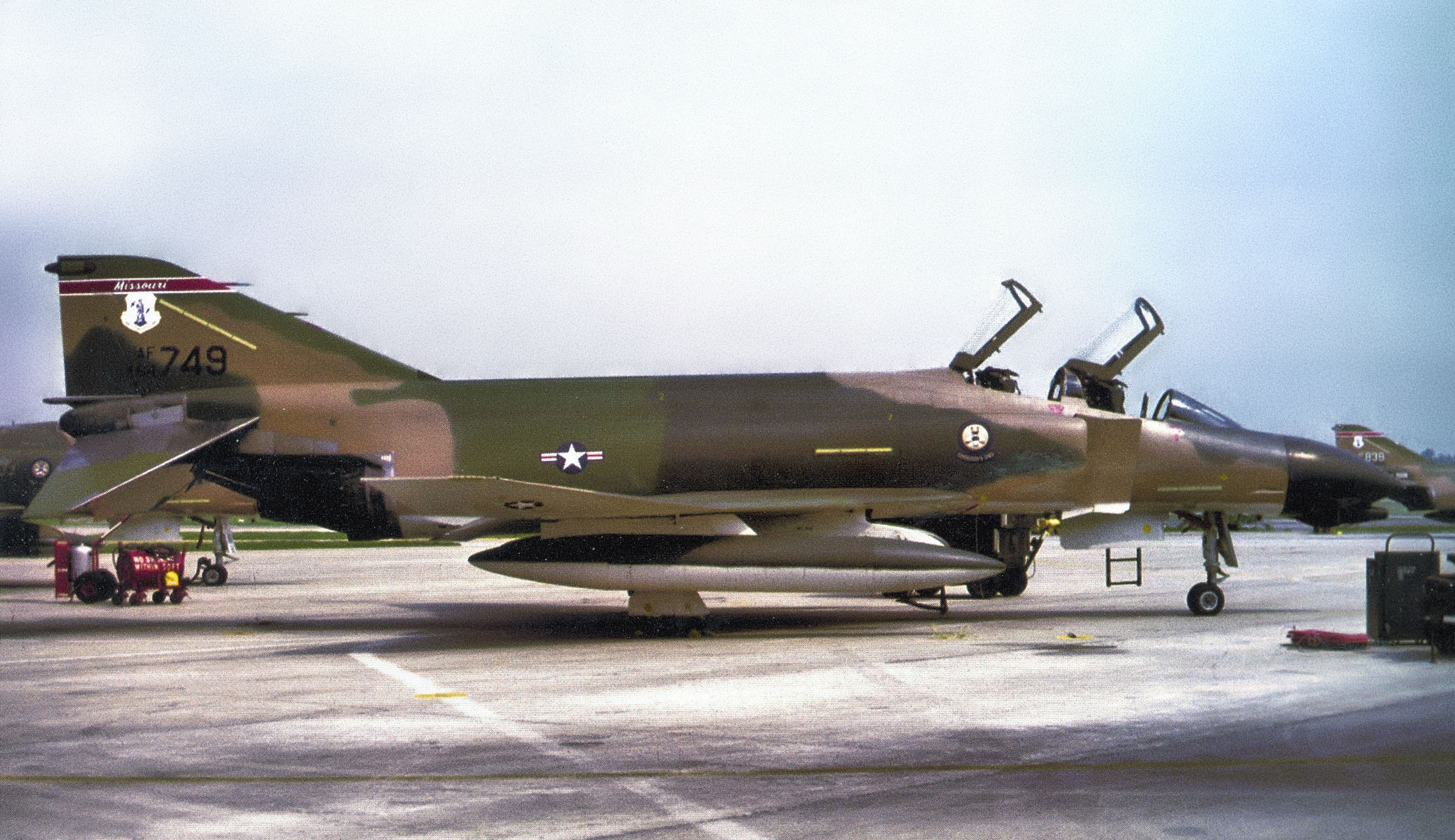
110th Tactical Fighter Squadron F-4C Phantom II (Note: Aircraft is McDonnell F-4C-23-MC Phantom II, serial at Robertson ANGB, Missouri, 1980.)

While in France, the Guardsmen assumed regular commitments on a training basis with the U.S. 7th Army as well as maintaining a 24-hour alert status. The 7131st exchanged both air and ground crews with the Royal Danish Air Force's 730th Tactical Fighter Squadron at Skydstrup Air Station, Denmark, during May 1962. As the Berlin situation subsided, all activated ANG units returned to the United States and released from active duty. The 7131st Wing was inactivated on 19 July 1962 and left its aircraft and equipment to USAFE.

After returning to St Louis, the unit was re-equipped with F-100C Super Sabres in late 1962. It trained with the F-100s for the next 17 years, during which time it upgraded to the F-100D in 1971. Although the 110th was not activated during the Vietnam War, many of the squadron's pilots were sent to F-100 squadrons in South Vietnam between 1968 and 1971. In 1977, Anne Morrow Lindbergh, Charles Lindbergh's widow, gave permission to designate 110th Tactical Fighter Squadron as "Lindbergh's Own."

In 1978, the unit acquired the "home grown" McDonnell Douglas F-4C Phantom II, the aircraft primarily being piloted by Vietnam War veterans. Between June and July 1982, the 110th deployed twelve Phantoms to RAF Leeming in the United Kingdom to participate in Exercise Coronet Cactus. The squadron upgraded to the more advanced F-4E Phantom II in 1985 and in 1991 again upgraded to the McDonnell Douglas F-15A/B Eagle air superiority aircraft when the F-4s were retired. The 110th was one of the last Air National Guard units to convert to the F-15.

==== Air Combat Command ====
More than 500 members from the 131st Fighter Wing and the tenant units located at Robertson Air National Guard Base were called into service to battle the Great Flood of 1993. In the post-Cold War era, the unit deployed to Incirlik Air Base, Turkey in support of Operation Northern Watch in 1996, 1997 and 1998.

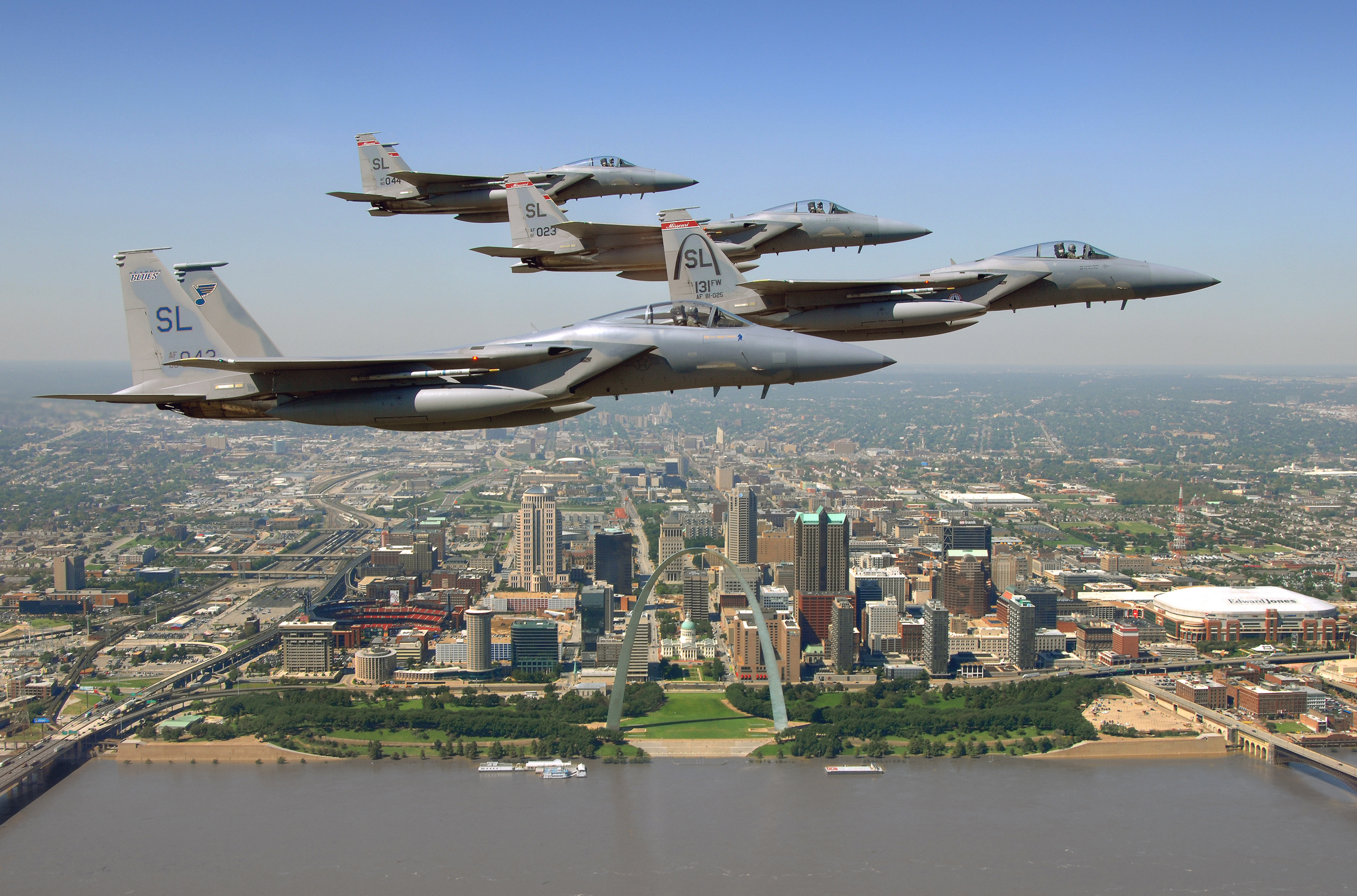
110th FS F-15Cs over St Louis Gateway Arch 2008

Members of the 131st returned in October 2000 from duty rotations in Southwest Asia and Europe, while other unit members were still stationed overseas. Eventually, a total of about 430 wing members were scheduled to deploy, with the majority leaving in October 2000 for Prince Sultan AB, Saudi Arabia, in support of Operation Southern Watch. A little more than half of the deployed 131st Fighter Wing members and 12 F-15s made up the AEF-9's 110th Expeditionary Fighter Squadron. The 110th primarily provided air superiority for Operation Southern Watch. AEF-9 was deployed from September through November 2000. In 2004, the improved F-15C Eagle arrived, replacing the older aircraft.

On 30 May 2007, a 110th F-15D pilot ejected safely from his aircraft just before it crashed during a training mission in rural Knox county, Indiana. The plane went down just before 11 am EDT south of Vincennes, near the Illinois border, as it conducted standard training maneuvers, according to a release from the National Guard. Investigators said the plane was flying at about 20,000 feet prior to the crash. The pilot had been with the 131st Fighter Wing for 12 years and was highly experienced, officials said. The unit had most recently enforced no-fly zones in Iraq. This crash decreased the 131st's aircraft count from 20 to 19.

On 2 November 2007, another F-15C from the 131st crashed in Mark Twain National Forest, in Missouri. No property was damaged and no people on the ground were hurt, however the pilot broke an arm and a shoulder, despite ejecting from the plane. The pilot also was said to be in "shock" when landowners found him. The crash was due to a flaw in a part of the plane's fuselage; this led to all F-15 aircraft being grounded at one point between November and January 2008. Since after the accidents, the 131st's flights have been reduced, also due to the wing slowly moving to flying B-2s. However the 131st and the F-15's were still on active duty.

In its 2005 Base Realignment and Closure recommendations, DoD recommended to realign the 131st Fighter Wing. The 110th's F-15s (15 aircraft) would be distributed to the 57th Fighter Wing, Nellis Air Force Base, Nevada (nine aircraft), and 177th Fighter Wing, Atlantic City International Airport, New Jersey (six aircraft). After which, the unit moved to Whiteman Air Force Base and became the first Air National Guard Northrop Grumman B-2 Spirit stealth bomber unit.

The F-15s began to leave Lambert on 15 August 2008 and by January 2009, most of the 13 remaining aircraft were in the main hangar being stripped of markings or already had their markings removed. The final two F-15Cs departed on 13 June 2009 after a closing ceremony titled "The End of an Era", that was attended by over 2,000 people. Some pilots were taking B-2 training courses while others are changing units, or decided to retire early. The 131st Fighter Wing was the most experienced F-15 Fighter wing in the United States; out of the four pilots that flew over 4,000 F-15 flight hours, three of them were from the unit.

==== Global Strike Command ====
The 110th Bomb Squadron, as part of the 131st Bomb Wing, transitioned to Air Force Global Strike Command on 4 October 2008 when the 131st Bomb Wing held a ribbon-cutting ceremony at Whiteman. The ceremony celebrated the first official drill for traditional guardsmen at Whiteman and the grand opening of building 3006, the 131st Bomb Wing's first headquarters there. On 16 June 2009, the last F-15 departed Lambert Field. In March 2011, crew from the 110th BS participated in Operation Odyssey Dawn, which saw airstrikes over Libya against the forces of Muammar Gaddafi.

In August 2013, the 131st Bomb Wing was deemed fully mission-capable, meaning that it fully completed the transition to Whiteman Air Force Base. In January 2017, aircrew from the 110th Bomb Squadron helped destroy ISIL terrorist camps in Sirte, Libya. The squadron has deployed multiple times in support of Bomber Task Forces; including RAF Fairford, UK, in March 2020, Keflavik Air Base, Iceland, in August 2021, and RAAF Amberley, AUS in August 2024.

In October 2024, pilots of the 110th Bomb Squadron comprised a large portion of the strike force and support network sent to destroy underground Houthi weapon storage areas in Yemen as part of Operation Poseidon Archer. Then again in March 2025, 110th pilots had a leading role in the months long Operation Rough Rider bombing campaign against the Houthis in Yemen, flying strike missions out of Diego Garcia.

On the night of June 21, 2025, members of the 131st Bomb Wing and the 110th Bomb Squadron comprised roughly 50% of the pilots that took part in the 2025 United States strikes on Iranian nuclear sites ("Operation Midnight Hammer"), the precision bombing of the Fordo and Natanz nuclear sites. The Esfahan nuclear site was subsequently hit with Tomahawk Land Attack Missiles (TLAM) from the U.S. Navy. This mission was the largest B-2 strike in history, and the longest continuous strike for the 131st Bomb Wing. It was also the first time the GBU-57 Massive Ordnance Penetrator was dropped in combat.

=== Lineage ===
Squadron K, Kelly Field

- Organized as 110th Aero Squadron on 14 August 1917 (Note: This unit is not related to the 110th Aero Squadron (Service) that was activated in May 1918 at Rich Field, Texas, moved to Dorr Field, Florida later that month, was redesignated Squadron K, Dorr Field in July and demobilized in November, 1918.)

Redesignated: 110th Aero Squadron (Repair) on 1 September 1917
Redesignated: 804th Aero Squadron (Repair) on 1 February 1918
Redesignated: Squadron K, Kelly Field on 23 July 1918
Demobilized on 18 November 1918
Reconstituted and consolidated with the 110th Observation Squadron on 20 October 1936

- Constituted as the 110th Observation Squadron and allotted to the Missouri NG

Organized on 23 June 1923
Consolidated with Squadron K, Kelly Field on 20 October 1936
Ordered to active service on 23 December 1940
Redesignated 110th Observation Squadron (Light) on 13 January 1942
Redesignated 110th Observation Squadron on 4 July 1942
Redesignated 110th Reconnaissance Squadron (Fighter) on 2 April 1943
Redesignated 110th Tactical Reconnaissance Squadron on 10 May 1944
Inactivated on 20 February 1946

- Redesignated 110th Fighter Squadron, Single Engine and allotted to the National Guard on 24 May 1946

Extended federal recognition on 23 September 1946
Federalized and placed on active duty on 1 March 1951
Redesignated 110th Fighter-Bomber Squadron on 9 April 1951
Released from active duty and returned to Missouri state control on 1 January 1953
Redesignated 110th Bombardment Squadron, Light on 1 January 1953
Redesignated 110th Bombardment Squadron, Tactical in 1955
Redesignated 110th Fighter-Interceptor Squadron on 15 June 1957
Redesignated 110th Fighter-Day Squadron on 1 June 1958
Redesignated 110th Tactical Fighter Squadron (Special Delivery) on 1 November 1958
Federalized and placed on active duty, 1 October 1961
Released from active duty and returned to Missouri state control, 31 August 1962
Redesignated 110th Tactical Fighter Squadron on 15 October 1962
Redesignated 110th Fighter Squadron on 31 March 1992
Redesignated 110th Bomb Squadron on 4 October 2008

=== Assignments ===
- Post Headquarters, Kelly Field, 14 August 1917 – 18 November 1918
- Missouri NG (divisional aviation, 35th Division), 23 June 1923
- VII Army Corps, c. December 1940
- II Air Support Command, 1 September 1941
- 71st Observation Group (later 71st Reconnaissance Group, 71st Tactical Reconnaissance Group), 1 October 1941
- Seventh Air Force, 20 October 1945
- Far East Air Forces (later Pacific Air Command, US Army), c. 3 December 1945 – 20 February 1946
- 131st Fighter Group (later 131st Composite Group, 131st Fighter Group), 131st Fighter-Bomber Group), 23 September 1946 – 1 January 1953
- 131st Bombardment Group (later 131st Fighter-Interceptor Group, 131st Fighter-Day Group, 131st Tactical Fighter Group, 1 January 1953
- 7131st Tactical Fighter Wing, 1 October 1961
- 131st Tactical Fighter Group, 31 August 1962
- 131st Tactical Fighter Wing, 1 December 1974
- 131st Operations Group, 1 January 1993 – present

=== Stations ===
- Kelly Field, Texas, 14 August 1917 – 18 November 1918
- Kinloch Airfield, St Louis, Missouri, 23 June 1923
- Lambert-St. Louis Flying Field, Missouri, July 1931
- Adams Field, Little Rock, Arkansas, 3 January 1941
- Salinas Army Air Base, California. 22 December 1941
- Esler Field, Louisiana, 28 January 1943
- Laurel Army Air Field, Mississippi, 1 April–20 October 1943
- Archerfield Airport, Brisbane, Queensland, Australia, 5 December 1943
- Wards Airfield (5 Mile Drome), Port Moresby, New Guina, 21 December 1943

Flight operated from Gusap Airfield, New Guinea after 20 January 1944

- Gusap Airfield, New Guinea, 7 February 1944

Operated from Tadji Airfield, New Guinea after 25 May 1944

- Tadji Airfield, New Guinea, 5 June 1944
- Mokmer Airfield, Biak, Netherlands East Indies, 11 September 1944
- Dulag Airfield, Leyte, Philippines, 3 November 1944 – 22 January 1945

Operated primarily from: Tacloban Airfield, Leyte, Philippines, to 24 December 1944
Operated primarily from: McGuire Field, Mindoro, Philippines, 25 December 1944 – 22 January 1945

- Lingayen Airfield, Luzon, Philippines, 20 January 1945
- Ie Shima Airfield, Ryukyu Islands, 29 July 1945
- Chofu Airfield, Japan, 6 October 1945
- Fort William McKinley, Luzon, Philippines, December 1945-20 February 1946
- Lambert-St. Louis International Airport, Missouri, 23 September 1946

Designated: Lambert Field Air National Guard Base, Missouri, 1991–2009

- Bergstrom Air Force Base, Texas, 1 March 1951
- George Air Force Base, California, July 1951-1 January 1953
- Lambert-St. Louis International Airport, Missouri, 1 January 1953
- Lambert-St. Louis International Airport, Missouri, 1 January 1953
- Toul-Rosieres Air Base, France, 1 October 1961
- Lambert-St. Louis International Airport (later Robertson Air National Guard Base), Missouri, 31 August 1962
- Whiteman Air Force Base, Missouri, 4 October 2008 – Present

=== Aircraft ===
- Curtiss JN-4, 1923–1927
- Douglas O-2C, 1926–1933
- Consolidated PT-1, 1927–1933
- Curtis O-11, 1928–1933
- Douglas O-2H, 1929–1933
- Consolidated O-17, 1930
- Douglas O-38, 1933–1941
- North American O-47, c. 1938–1942
- Bell P-39 Airacobra, 1942–1944
- P-40 Warhawk, 1942–1945
- F-10 Mitchell, 1943
- F-3A Havoc, 1942–1943
- F-6 Mustang, 1945
- F-51D Mustang, 1946–1952
- B-26 Invader, 1953–1957
- F-80 Shooting Star, 1957
- F-84F Thunderstreak, 1957–1962
- F-100C/F Super Sabre, 1962–1971
- F-100D/F Super Sabre, 1971–1979
- F-4C Phantom II, 1979–1985
- F-4E Phantom II, 1985–1991
- F-15A/B Eagle, 1991–2004
- F-15C/D Eagle, 2004–2009
- B-2 Spirit, 2009–present

== See also ==
- List of American aero squadrons
- List of observation squadrons of the United States Army National Guard
