= 1st Air Base Group =

Puerto Rico State Guard aviation unit

1st Air Support Group - Puerto Rico State Guard
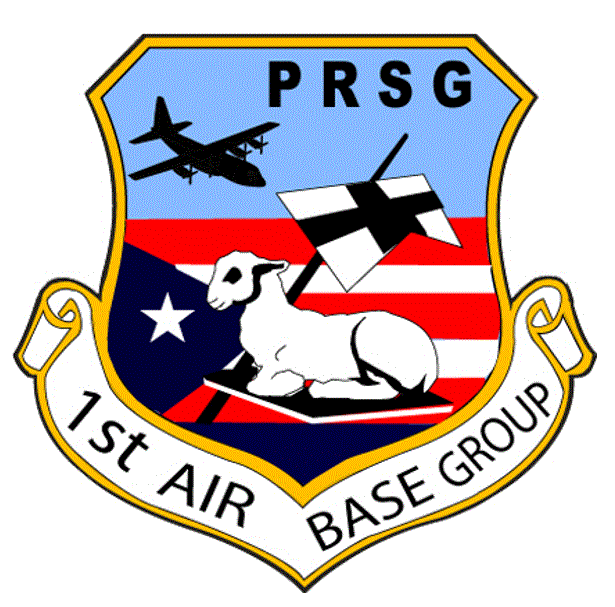
- 1st Air Base Group coat of arms
- Active: 1970–present
- Country: United States
- Allegiance: Constitution of Puerto Rico & United States Constitution
- Type: State Defense Force
- Role: Military Support to Civil Authorities
- Size: Authorized Maximum Strength of 585 State Airmen
- Part of: Puerto Rico National Guard
- Garrison/HQ: Muñiz Air National Guard Base, Carolina, Puerto Rico

Commanders
- Current commander: Col. Alexis Santiago Caraballo
- Ceremonial chief: Hon. Jenniffer González-Colón

1st Air Support Group (PRSG), is an air support unit of the Puerto Rico State Guard (PRSG) .The 1st Air Base Group is the major commanding unit of the Puerto Rican State Guard serving under the Military Defense Forces of Puerto Rico. Operating under command of the Puerto Rico Adjutant General, and the Commanding General serving for the Puerto Rico State Guard.

== History ==
- In 1970, Brig Gen Roberto Vargas, PRANG, Commander of the Puerto Rico Air National Guard (PRANG), and Mrs. Carmen Colbert organized the 1st Air Base Group with a similar structure to that of the then-156th Tactical Fighter Group's units. At that time the 1 ABG was composed by 25 officers and 4 enlisted personnel.
- 1970: Brig Gen Mihel Ghilormini, PRANG, was commissioned by Brig Gen Vargas to command the 1 ABG.
- 1982, Col Roberto Montes, PRANG, Commander of the PRANG, started a recruiting effort to staff the PR Air State Guard cadre organization in support of the 156 TFG.
- 1986: Col(Ret) Miguel Martoranni, PRANG, former Air Force pilot, became the commander of the 1 ABG.
- 1988: Col(Ret) Dennis López, PRANG, former 156 TFG Commander, commanded the 1 ABG.
- 1992: Col John J. Gonzalez, PRASG, was named commander of 1 ABG. He had prior service with the US Navy and US Air Force.
- 2004: Col Orlando Olivera, PRASG, was named 1ABG commander. Col Olivera served in the US Army Reserve.
- 2010: Col José E. Picó-Del Rosario, PRASG, was named 1 ABG commander by BG (PR) Hector Sorrentini.
- 2015: Col Jesus E. (Nesty) Delgado-Morales, PRASG, was named 1ABG commander by BG(PR) Carlos M. Martinez.
- 2018: LtCol. Angel E. Resto, PRASG, was named 1 ABG commander by BG (PR) Edwin I. Rivera-Malave.
- 2020: Col Edwin Ramos-Jourdan, PRASG, was named 1st Air Support Group Commander by BG (PR) Ricardo Falcon.

== 21st century ==
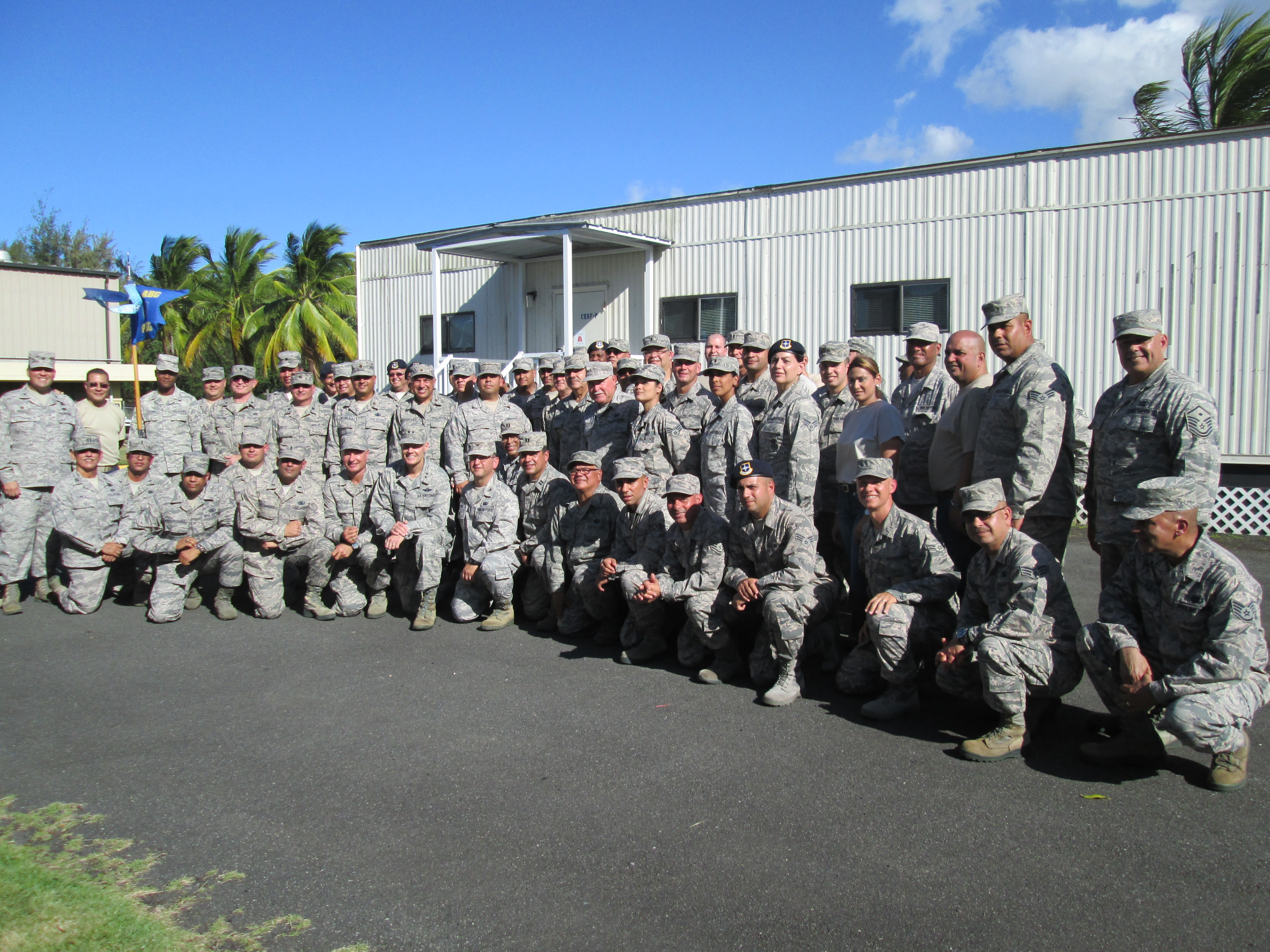

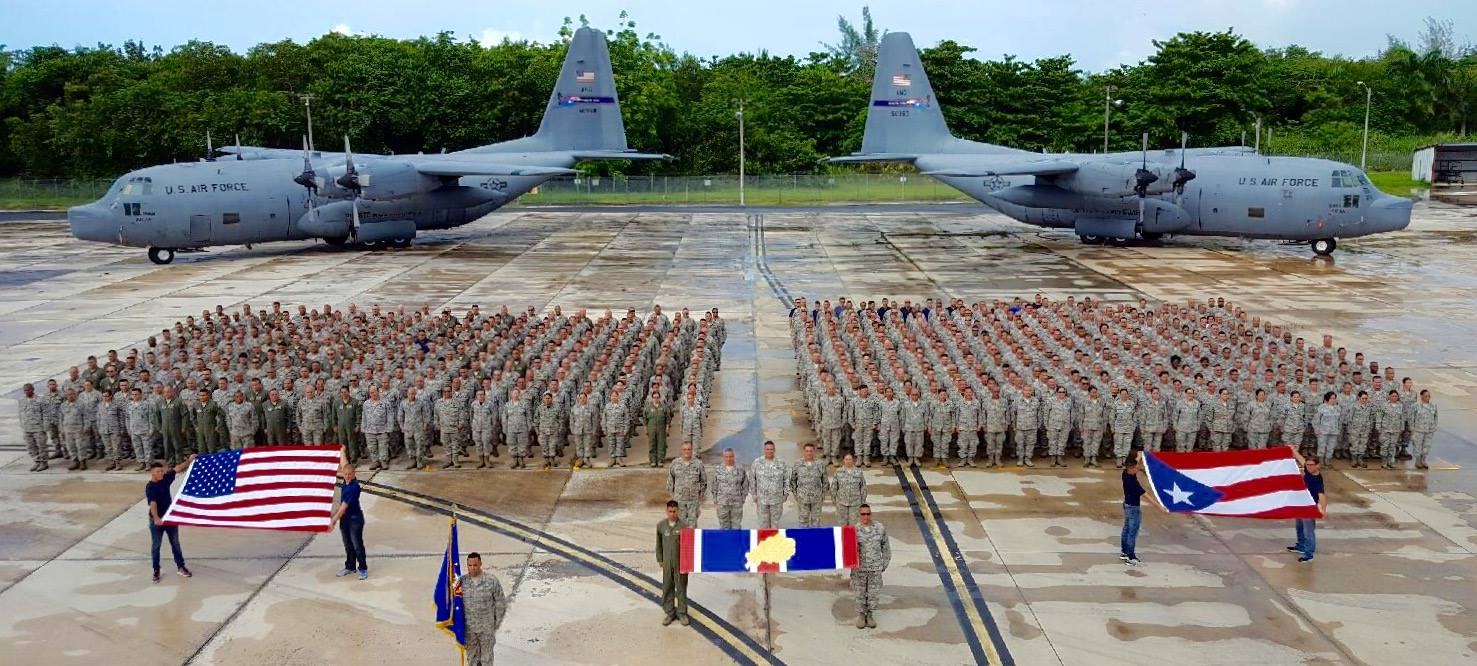

The 1st Air Support Group is composed of:

- Headquarters Squadron (Unit 700)
  - Command & Special Staff
  - Personnel Section
  - Operations & Training Section
- Logistic Squadron (Unit 701)
  - Transportation Flight
  - Supply Flight
  - Aerial Port Flight
- Medical Squadron (Unit 702)
- Mission Support Squadron (Unit 703)
  - Civil Engineering Flight
  - Force Support (Services & FSRT) Flight
  - Security Forces Flight
  - Fire Fighter Flight
  - 741st Support Flight
  - 740th Support Flight

The 1ASG have two support flights to provide support to the 140th Air Defense Squadron in Punta Salinas and the 141st Air Control Squadron in Punta Borinquén Aguadilla. All 1st Air Support Group units are organized to meet the military training requirements necessary to take over the Puerto Rico Air National Guard installations upon mobilization and deployment of their units.

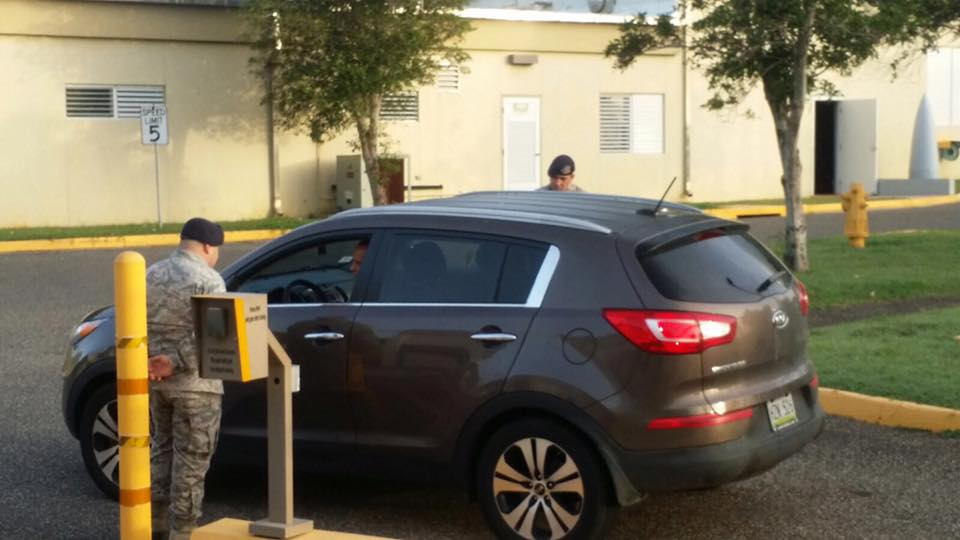
741st Security Forces working on Main Gate 141ACS

The 1st Air Support Group training is conducted in accordance with USAF regulations, which supplements the PRSG and PRNG regulations, directives and guidance. Unit Training Assemblies (UTAs) are performed jointly with PRANG's 156th AW in a consolidated drill concept. These trainings are performed jointly with 156th AW personnel. It allows 1ASG personnel to acquire hands-on experience of what their duty will be if PRANG units are mobilize and deployed. It also gives them the opportunity to be trained by their counterpart in their specialty and get the feeling of a real life scenario, while getting ready for it. These drills are performed concurrently with 156th AW UTA schedule.

All 1st Air Support Group units and members attend consolidated drills. This form of UTA's is used to:

- Maintain lines of communication among all units
- Conduct general military training and OJT with the Puerto Rico Air National Guard counterparts
- Conduct Emergency Management training under the Federal Emergency Management Agency (FEMA) Guidelines and the SGAUS's Military Emergency Management Specialist Academy
- Conduct promotion and award ceremonies and other special events
- General inspections
- Practice drills and ceremonies
- Maintain Unit Integrity

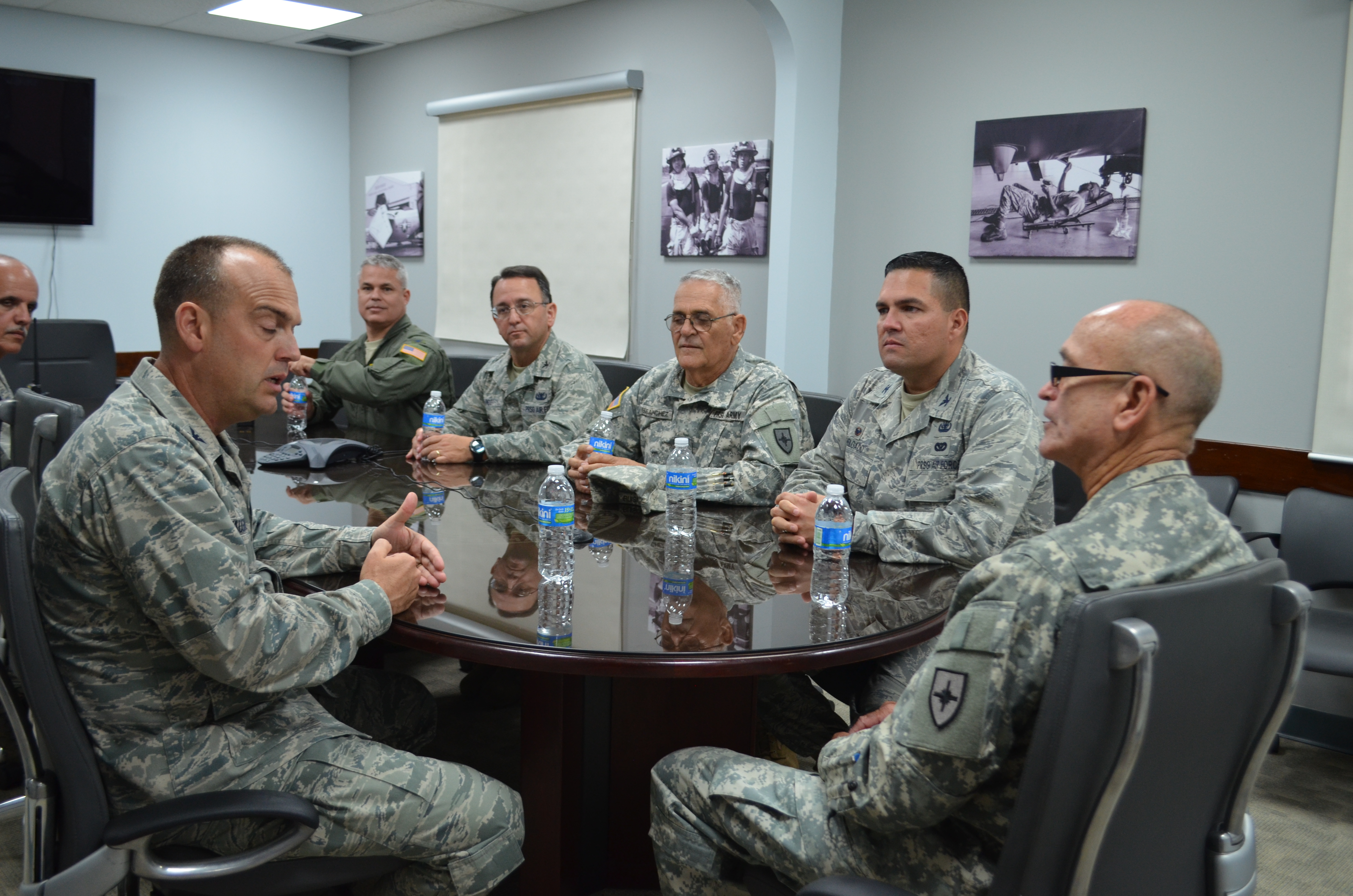
BG Carlos M Martinez meeting with Col Edward L. Vaughan

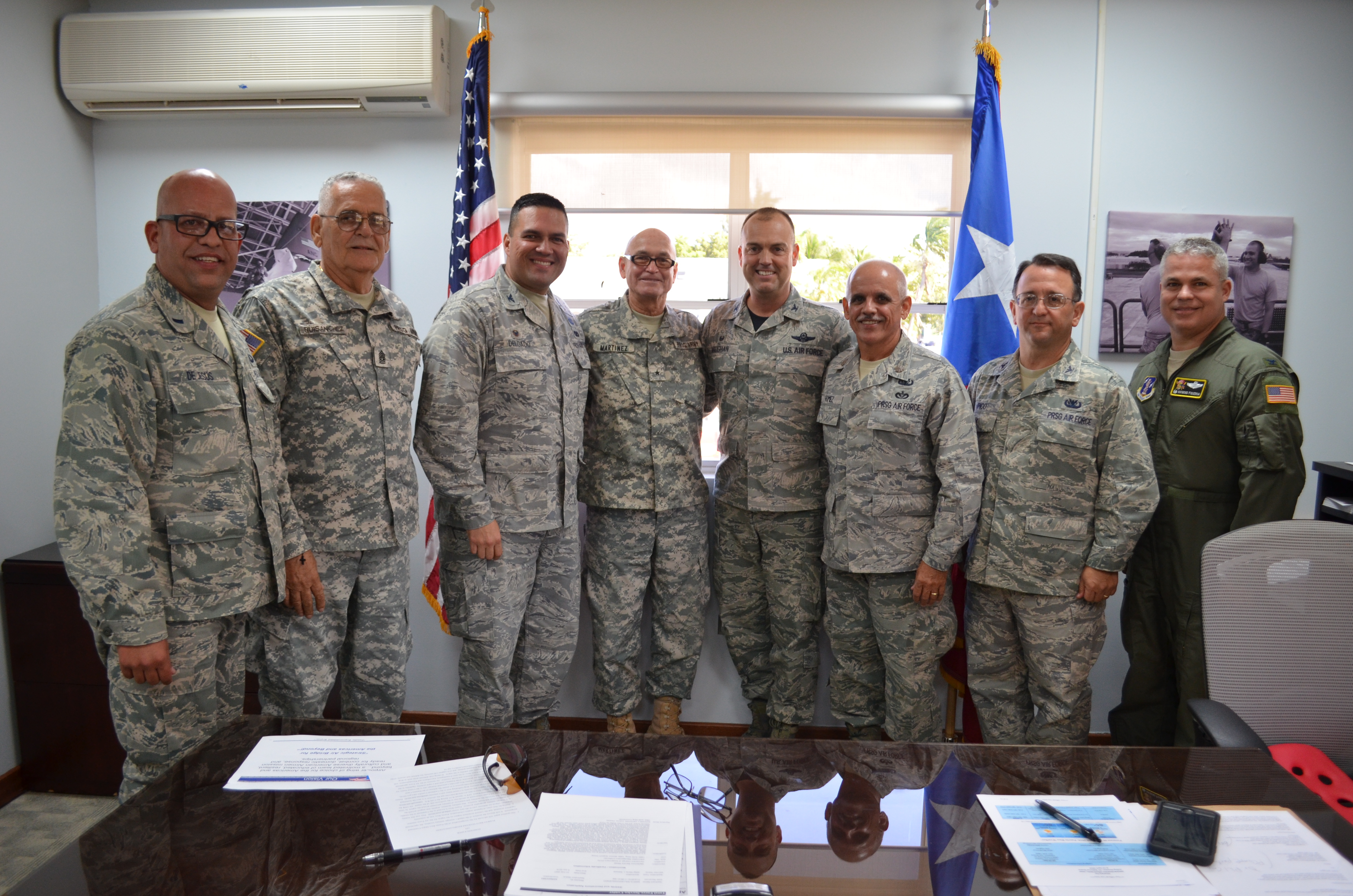
BG Carlos M Martinez meeting with Col Edward L. Vaughan

== Duties ==
- Operational Support to the 156 AW units (Mission Support Squadron (Engineering Flight, Services Flight, Personnel Flight, Security Forces Flight and Fire Fighter Flight), a Medical Squadron, and a Logistic Squadron (Transportation Flight, Supply Flight and an Aerial Port Flight))
- Military Emergency Management Specialists and Assists local civil authorities and Volunteer coordination during emergencies under the Puerto Rico National Guard Directorate of Domestic Operations and Military Support.
- Medical Services (Doctors, Nurses, Mental Health & Paramedics)
- Legal Support (attorneys & paralegals)
- Chaplain Services

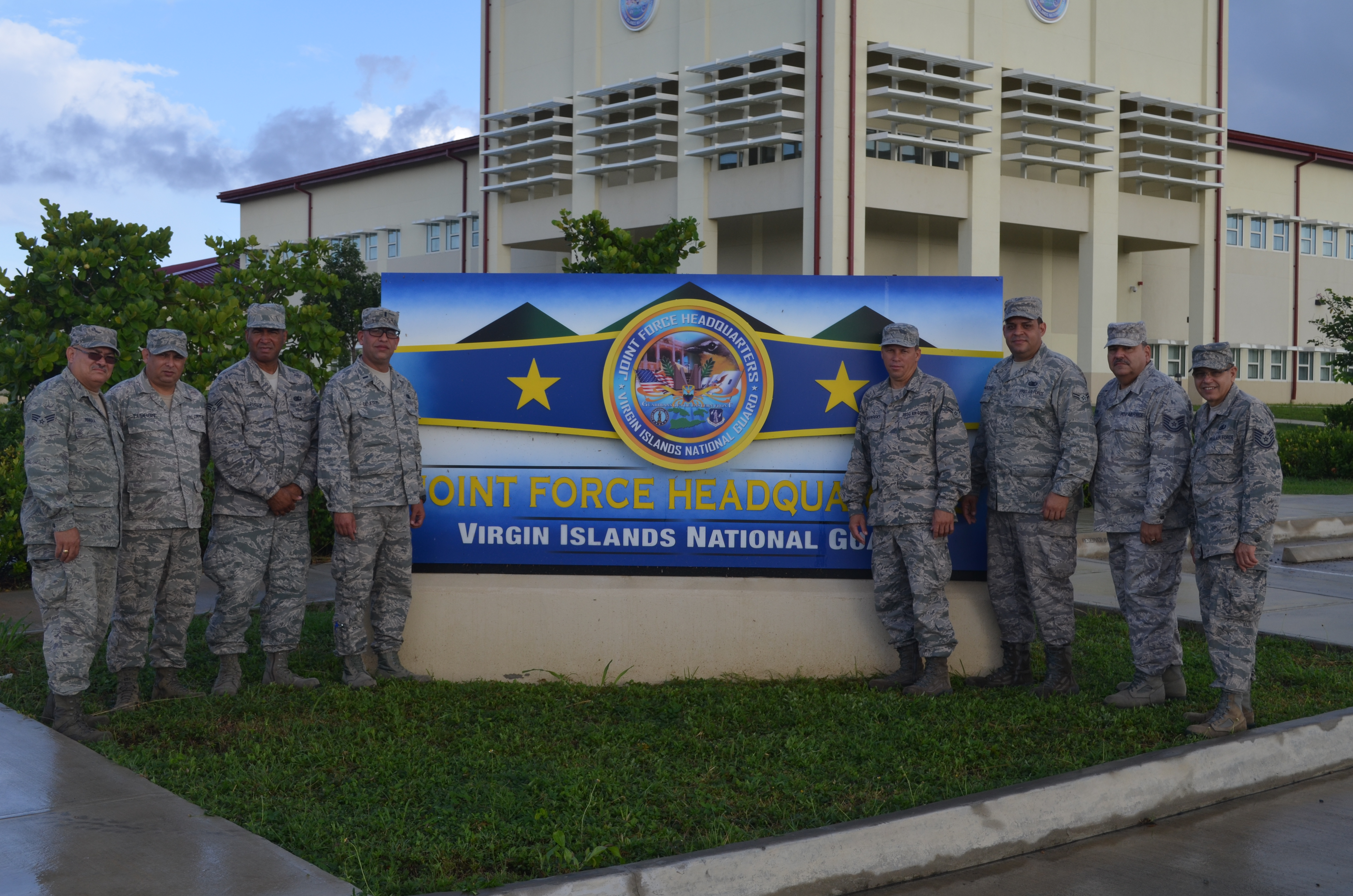
Saint Croix DFT Mission 2016

The PRSG is the state's authorized militia and assumes the state mission of the Puerto Rico National Guard in the event the National Guard is mobilized. Unlike the Civil Air Patrol or the United States Coast Guard Auxiliary, the PRSG is a statutory military entity of the Commonwealth of Puerto Rico with each PRSG member subject to the Puerto Rico Code of Military Justice (Law 62). Under state law, enlisted members and officers of the PRSG have the same similar legal status, privileges, and/or immunities as members of the state National Guard (in state status) when called to State Active Duty (SAD) or in drill status.

As a state-organized militia, the PRSG ranks are official state military ranks in accordance with the Article 1, Section 8, Clause 16 of the United States Constitution, where the US Congress received the power “to provide for organizing, arming, and disciplining, the Militia, and for governing such Part of them as may be employed in the Service of the United States, reserving to the States respectively, the Appointment of the Officers, and the Authority of training the Militia according to the discipline prescribed by Congress”. All PRSG appointments, commissions, warrants, and enlistments are recognized and authorized by the Governor of Puerto Rico through the Adjutant General of PR. The PRSG military personnel render to all members of the military community, and receive from them, all courtesies common to all such members, such as saluting, and forms of address.

As a historic milestone for the Unit, From August 13 to 17, 2016, a selected group of nine 1st Air Base Group Civil Engineering Flight traveled and participated in a DFT Mission in support of the US Virgin Island National Guard. During the mission, our airmen performed rehabilitation and maintenance tasks at the USVING Joint Forces Headquarters. The group was led by 1st Lt Alexander De Jesus, 1ABG CEF Commander. Their performance was recognized by the USVI TAG, BG (VI) Deborah Howell and her Senior Staff.

== Uniform ==
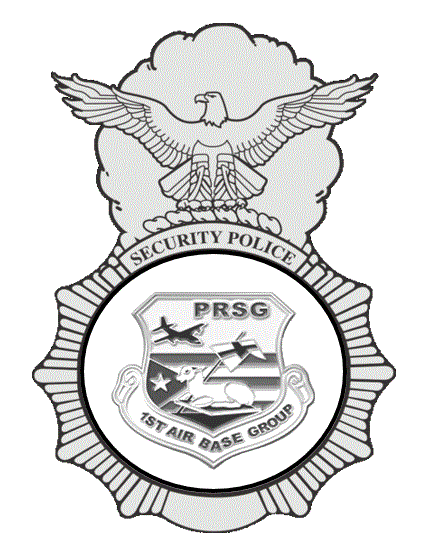
1ABG Security Forces Badge

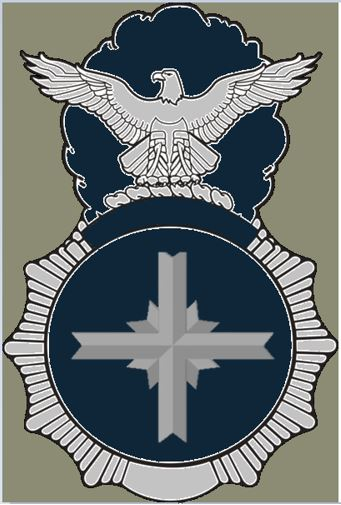
1ABG Security Forces ABU Patch

As approved by the Puerto Rico Adjutant General, the military uniforms worn by the 1st Support Base Group personnel are a variation of the U.S. Air Force's Airman Battle Uniform, the USAF's Service Dress Uniform and the USAF's Mess Dress. 1st Air Base Group members must use the PRSG AIR FORCE distinctive marking on those authorized uniforms. All unit commanders will ensure that all members, individually and collectively, present a professional, well-groomed appearance, which will reflect credit upon PRSG Air Force as the State Guard of the Puerto Rico National Guard. The following Military and USAF Style Specialty Badges are authorized to professional members of the 1st Air Base Group:

- Military Emergency Management Specialist (Basic, Senior or Master)
- Civil Engineering Badge (Basic, Senior or Master)
- Medical Corps Badge (Basic, Senior or Master)
- Dental Corps Badge (Basic, Senior or Master)

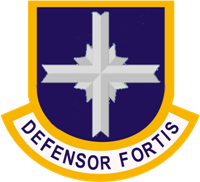
1ABG Security Forces Beret Flash

- Nurse Corps Badge (Basic, Senior or Master)
- Chaplain (Christian) Badge
- Judge Advocate Badge
- Security Forces Badge & Beret Flash
- Fire Fighter Badge

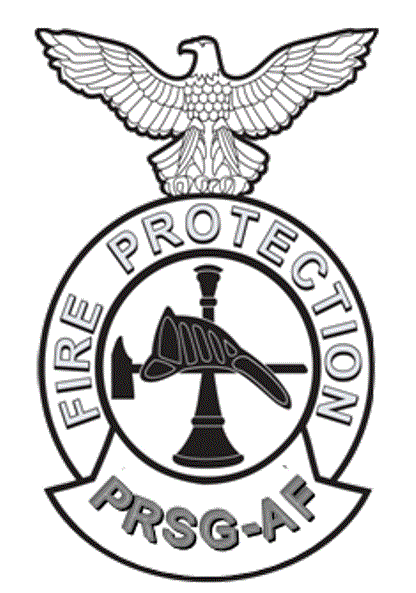
1ABG Fire Fighters Badge

As a regulation governing the use of those Specialty Badges, the 1ABG published the Career Field Education and Training Plan (CFETP) Policy Manual. The CFETP provides information for the Civil Engineer, Medical Corps, Dental Corps, Nurse Corps, Chaplain, Judge Advocate, Emergency Managers, Security Forces and Fire Protection occupational series. That plan outlines desired training, education, and experience to chart and execute a career in those career fields—from entry-level officer/NCO through squadron commander. The CFETP also provides officers, supervisors, and commanders a means to jointly plan and program training and education opportunities. Each officer and NCO should use The CFETP to work with supervisors and commanders to determine appropriate levels and timing of education and training, and ensure they have every opportunity to attend continuing education courses. Every officer or NCO should take the initiative to determine realistic milestones for achieving their goals. Completion of education, training, and experience is a joint responsibility between the officer, their supervisor, and the commander.

== Training ==
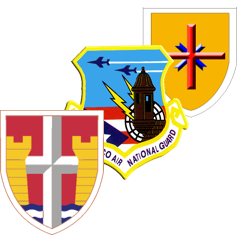
Puerto Rico National Guard Logos

In January 2014, the 1st Air Base Group published the 1ABG Airman Manual establishing military standards, qualifications, and as a means to verify readiness. This manual has been created to assist 1ABG airmen in their military careers. It is intended to provide quick guidance to the customs, courtesies, and basic knowledge of the United States Air Force (USAF) and life in the PRSG Air Force. Whether the member has prior military experience. This guide sets forth the basic military principles and policies required of an airman.

The contents of this publication are a compilation of materials from military manuals and guides and is designed to serve as a guide to all members of the 1st Air Support Group-Puerto Rico State Guard. This manual is intended to be used as an orientation resource for new members and a reference document for all personnel.

The 1ABG Airman Manual includes the following chapters:

- PRSG History, Legal Definition & Capabilities
- PRNG & USAF History
- 1ABG History & Organization
- Military Uniforms & Ranks
- Customs, Courtesies & Protocols
- Drill & Ceremonies
- Airman's Basic Skills
- Military Emergency Management
- Annexes:
  - PRSG Regulations 600-100 (Officers Program Regulation)
  - PRSG Regulations 600-200 (Enlisted & NCO Program Regulation)
  - PRSG 1ABG Career Field Education and Training Plan (CFETP) Policy Manual
  - National Guard Bureau Regulation 10–4

Also, all 1st Air Support Group personnel participate in other Professional Military Education specialized and general training:

- Basic Military Training (Non-Prior Service Leadership Course)
- Basic and Advanced Non-Commissioned Officer Training (Basic NCO Leaders Course, Advance NCO Leaders Course, and First Sergeant School)
- Basic and Advanced Officer Training (Squadron Officer Course, Basic Officer Leaders Course & Advance Officer Leaders Course, Command & Staff Course)
- Basic Military Marksmanship Course
- Community Emergency Response Team (CERT) given in concert with FEMA/DHS
- Military Emergency Management Specialist (MEMS) Certification

During Training Year 2010-2011 the 1st Air Base Group participated as a Unit in the Military Emergency Management Specialist (MEMS) Program. The Military Emergency Management Specialist (MEMS) Academy was established by the State Guard Association of the United States, Inc. (SGAUS) in 1998 to promote and advance the practice of emergency management among the various State Defense Forces or State Military Reserves. The program is structured around the Federal Emergency Management Agency's National Incident Management System (NIMS) and Incident Command System (ICS).

The 1ABG certified 90% of their personnel as MEMS Basic and NIMS Compliance, being the first and only State Defense Force Unit in the Nation to achieve that goal.

With the support of the PRSG MEMS Academy staff & instructors, the 1ABG completed the following FEMA-Emergency Management Institute classroom courses:

- IS100 Introduction to Incident Command System
- IS200 Basic Incident Command System
- IS700 National Incident Management System
- IS800b National Response Framework
- IS775 Emergency Operations Center
- IS208 State Disaster Management
- Q534 Emergency Response to Terrorism

Also as a Group, as a requirement for the Basic MEMS Certification, they completed a Point of Distribution Exercise planned under Incident Command principles at Puerto Rico National Guard's Camp Santiago Joint Maneuvering Training Site, Salinas, PR.

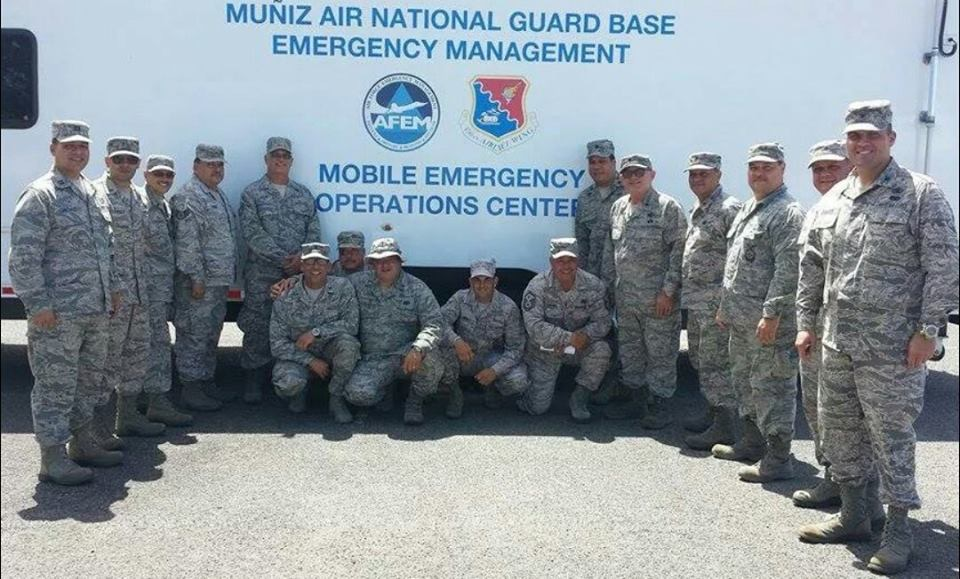
POD FULL SCALE EX 2014

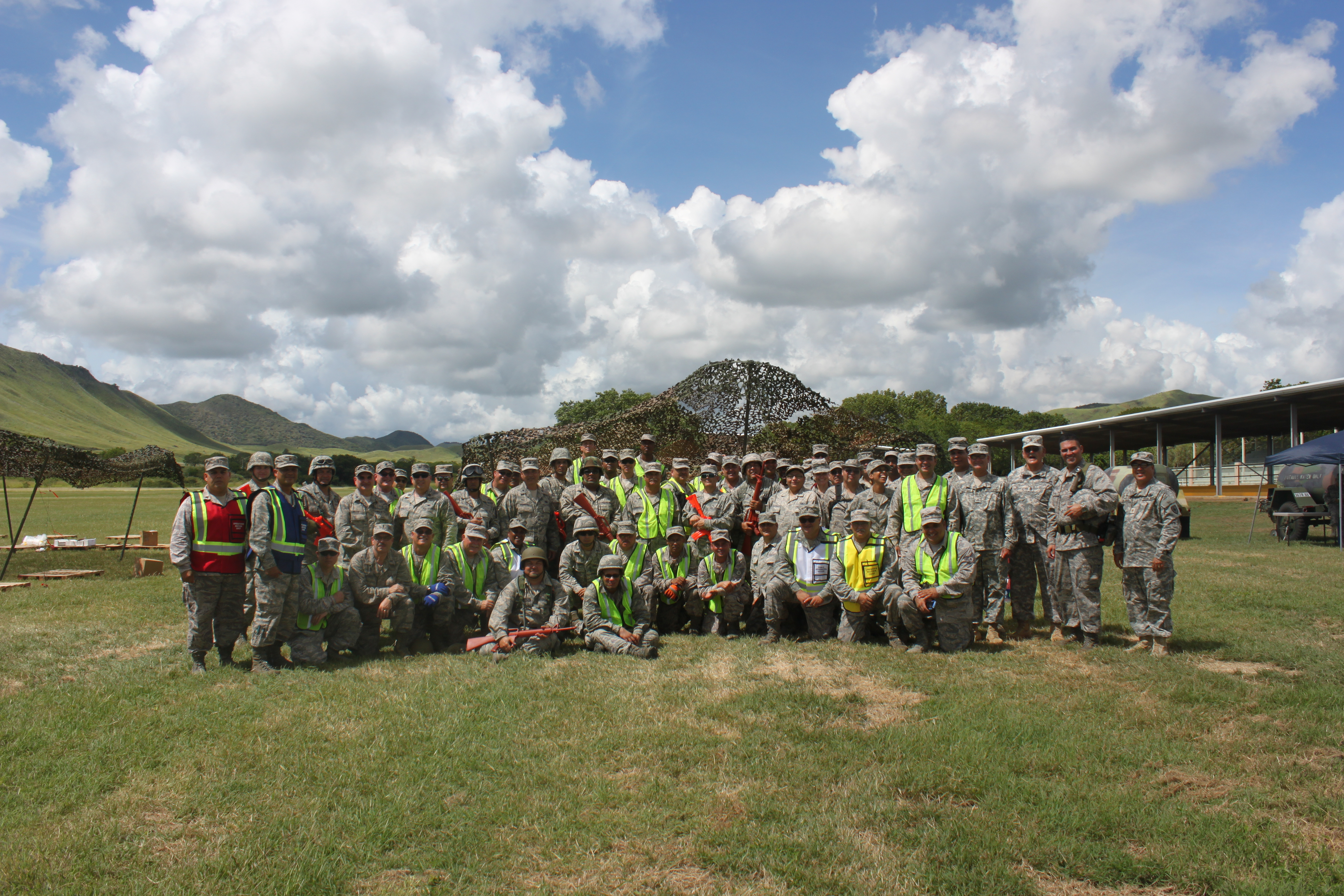
POD FULL SCALE EX 2014 GROUP PIC

In 2016, the 1st ABG, in a joint effort with the 156AW Security Forces Squadron, implemented the Security Forces Basic Orientation Course (SFBOC) for Air State Guard Personnel. The course serves as an introduction of Security Forces concepts of operations. It will also direct their knowledge toward the U.S. Air Force and Air National Guard security forces culture. It will give all these personnel the basic necessary knowledge to support the PRANG Mission. The participants completed 73 contact hours of Professional Military Education including the following topics: Security Forces Concepts of Operations, Military Law and Jurisdiction, Authority, Communications, Counter Bloodborne & Pathogens, Reports, Challenge (Foot & Vehicle), Handcuffing, Individual, Areas & Vehicles Searches, ASP Baton, Individual & Small Team Tactics, Entry Control Procedures, AF Form 1109, AF Form 52, Sec Forces Combative, Arming & Use of Force, Rules of Engagement.

== Meritorious Unit Citation awarded by the State Guard Association of USA ==
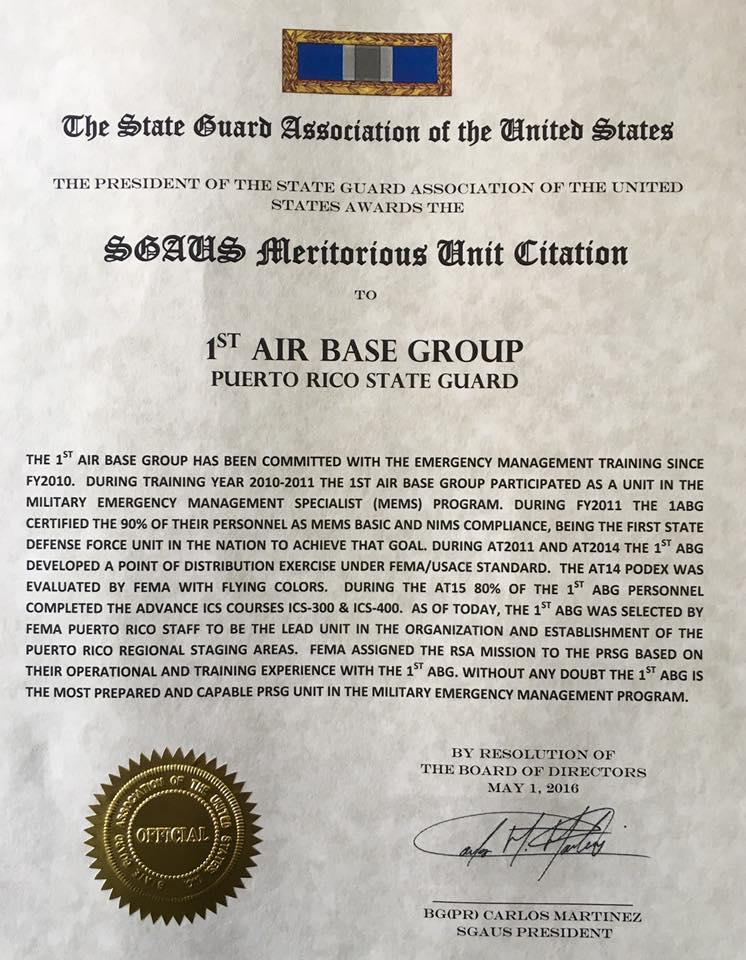
SGAUS Meritorious Unit Citation

On May 1, 2016, the 1ABG received the Meritorious Unit Citation awarded to the 1st Air Base Group-Puerto Rico Air State Guard by the State Guard Association of the United States. This national-level recognition is awarded to the 1st ABG for its achievements in the Emergency Management and Regional Points of Distribution Program in support to the PR Emergency Management Agency and FEMA mission. And for being the first State Guard Unit that qualifies more than 90% of their personnel as Basic Military Emergency Management Specialists.

== See also ==
- Military history of Puerto Rico
- State Guard Association of the United States
- Puerto Rico State Guard
- Puerto Rico National Guard
- Puerto Rico Air National Guard
- Muñiz Air National Guard Base
- 156th Airlift Wing
- Awards and decorations of the State Defense Forces
