= Emilio Díaz Colón =

United States general

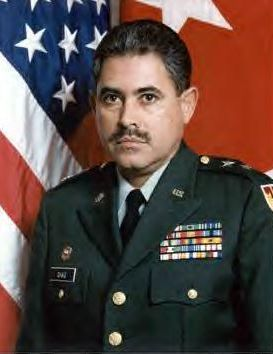
- Major General Emilio Díaz Colón

Adjutant General of Puerto Rico
- In office 1993–2001
- Governor: Pedro Rosselló
- Preceded by: William Miranda Marín
- Succeeded by: Francisco A. Márquez

Superintendent of the Puerto Rico Police
- In office July 7, 2011 – March 28, 2012
- Governor: Luis Fortuño
- Preceded by: José Luis Rivera
- Succeeded by: Héctor Pesquera

Personal details
- Born: 1947 (age 78–79) Yabucoa, Puerto Rico
- Education: University of Puerto Rico at Mayagüez (BEng)

Military service
- Allegiance: United States; Puerto Rico
- Branch/service: Puerto Rico Army National Guard
- Years of service: 1968-2001
- Rank: Major General
- Unit: 101st Troop Command; 892d Engineer Company
- Commands: Puerto Rico Adjutant General; 130th Engineer Battalion

Major General Emilio Díaz Colón (born c. 1947), is a former United States National Guard officer who served as the Adjutant General of the Puerto Rican National Guard. In 2011, he became the first member of the PRNG to be named superintendent of the Puerto Rico Police Department.

== Early years ==
Díaz Colón is the oldest of three siblings born to Emilio Díaz Lebron and Margarita Colón in the town of Yabucoa, Puerto Rico. His father was the head foreman of the Central Roig sugar cane plantation. The Central Roig was one of the last mills that produced sugar in Puerto Rico. Díaz Colón was raised in his hometown where he received his primary and secondary education. Díaz Colón's brother, Luis F. "Pickie" Díaz Colón, a former head of the National Parks Company, was once the mayor of their hometown Yabucoa.

In 1968, Díaz Colón joined the Puerto Rico Army National Guard (PRARNG) as an enlisted soldier in an engineer unit, while at the same time he was enrolled and attended classes at the University of Puerto Rico at Mayagüez earning in 1971 a Bachelor of Arts degree in Civil Engineering.

== Military career ==
Díaz Colón was selected to attend the warrant officer program at the United States Army Warrant Officer Career College in Fort Rucker, Alabama. Upon his graduation on February 4, 1975, he was promoted to the rank of Warrant Officer One (WO1). He was then assigned to the HHC 130th Engineer Battalion in Vega Baja, Puerto Rico where he served as Utilities Maintenance Technician. On August 3, 1976, he was promoted to the rank of first lieutenant and assigned as engineering officer for the same Battalion. From January 1977 to August 1979, Díaz Colón served with Company D 130th Engineer Battalion at Carolina, Puerto Rico in the positions of Engineer Platoon Leader and Company Executive Officer. After his promotion to the rank of captain he was named company commander.

In August 1979, he was reassigned to the 892d Engineer Company at Humacao, Puerto Rico as company commander and in September 1979, he was the Assistant S-3 of the Command and Control at PRNG Headquarters in San Juan, Puerto Rico. He served there until October 1979, when he returned to the 130th Engineer Battalion as battalion executive officer.

- Feb 75 - Aug 76, Utilities Maintenance Technician, HHC 130th Engineer Battalion, Vega Baja, Puerto Rico
- Aug 76 - Jan 77, Engineering Officer, HHC 130th Engineer Battalion, Vega Baja, Puerto Rico
- Jan 77 - May 77, Engineer Platoon Leader, Company D 130th Engineer Battalion, Carolina, Puerto Rico
- May 77 - Nov 77, Company Executive Officer, Company D, 130th Engineer Battalion, Carolina, Puerto Rico
- Nov 77 - Aug 79, Company Commander, Company D 130th Engineer Battalion, Carolina, Puerto Rico
- Aug 79 - Sep 79, Company Commander, 892d Engineer Company, Humacao, Puerto Rico
- Sep 79 - Oct 79, Assistant S-3, Command and Control, Headquarters, San Juan, Puerto Rico
- Oct 79 - Feb 83, Battalion Executive Officer, 130th Engineer Battalion, Vega Baja, Puerto Rico
- Feb 83 - Aug 85, Battalion Commander, 130th Engineer Battalion, Vega Baja, Puerto Rico
- Aug 85 - Jun 87, S-4, 101st Troop Command, Headquarters, State Area Command, San Juan, Puerto Rico
- Jun 87 - Feb 88, S-3, 101st Troop Command, Headquarters, State Area Command, San Juan, Puerto Rico
- Mar 88 - Jun 92, Executive Officer, 101st Troop Command, Headquarters State Area Command, San Juan, Puerto Rico
- Jul 92 - Dec 92, USAR - Not Active Duty Control Group (Individual Ready Reserve)
- Dec 92 - Jan 93, Deputy Chief of Staff, Headquarters State Area Command, San Juan, Puerto Rico
- Jan 93 - Jan 01, The Adjutant General, Puerto Rico National Guard, Headquarters State Area Command, San Juan, Puerto Rico

== Government positions ==
In 1978, the governor of Puerto Rico, Carlos Romero Barcelo appointed Díaz Colón to the position of executive director of the Authority of Solid Wastes in Puerto Rico. He served in this position until 1981. In that year, he was named director of the Commissioners Office of Municipal Matters. He served in this position until 1985, all the while in 1982, he was promoted to the rank of major and in 1983, he graduated from the United States Army Command and General Staff College in Fort Leavenworth, Kansas.

During the years that he served in the Commissioners Office, the Puerto Rico National Guard named Díaz Colón Battalion Commander of the 130th Engineer Battalion. From 1985 to 1990, Díaz-Colón was given a Federal position when he was placed in charge of the Housing Urban Development (HUD) in the Caribbean.

== Adjutant General, Puerto Rico National Guard ==
From August 1985 to June 1992, Díaz Colón served with the 101st Troop Command at Headquarters, State Area Command, San Juan, Puerto Rico. On July 24, 1987, he was promoted to lieutenant colonel and during the years in which he served at headquarters, he served in various positions, including that of executive officer. On July 23, 1992, Díaz Colón was promoted to the rank of colonel in the Regular Army and on December 22, of the same year he was promoted to the rank of brigadier general. In January 1993, he was named the adjutant general of the Puerto Rico National Guard. As adjutant general, he was the governor's senior military adviser and oversaw both state and federal missions of the Puerto Rico National Guard. He also provided effective leadership and management in the implementation of all programs and policies affecting more than 11,100 Puerto Rico National Guard citizens-soldiers. Díaz Colón was promoted to major general (line) on November 18, 1993, and continued as adjutant general until he retired from the Puerto Rico Army National Guard in 2001.

== Superintendent of the Police of Puerto Rico ==
In July 2011, Luis Fortuño, the governor of Puerto Rico, named Díaz Colón for the position of superintendent of the Puerto Rico Police Department. He thus became the first person who was a former adjutant general of the Puerto Rico National Guard to be named to that position. Díaz Colón entered the Police Department in the middle of a record-breaking year in murders in Puerto Rico, and has received harsh criticisms ever since from various sectors. On March 28, 2012, after only 9 months on the job, Díaz Colón resigned as superintendent.

== Military decorations and awards ==
Among Major General Díaz Colón's military decorations and awards are the following:

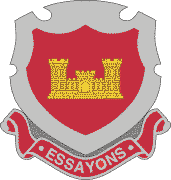
Regimental Insignia

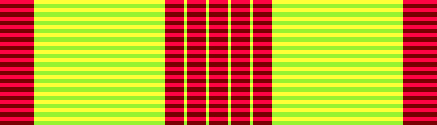
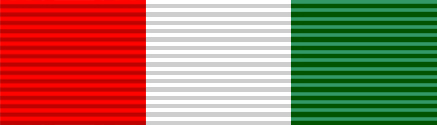
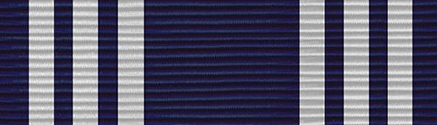
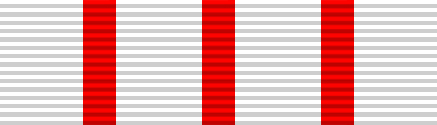
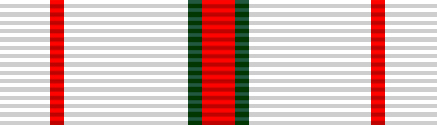
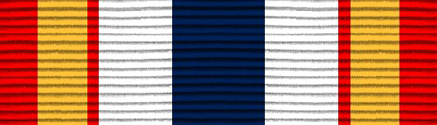
Meritorious Service Medal
Army Commendation Medal with one bronze Oak leaf cluster
Army Achievement Medal
Army Reserve Components Achievement Medal with one bronze Oak leaf cluster
National Defense Service Medal
Humanitarian Service Medal
Armed Forces Reserve Medal with Gold hourglass device
Army Service Ribbon
Puerto Rico Commendation Medal with one bronze Oak leaf cluster
Puerto Rico Service Medal
Puerto Rico Exemplary Conduct Ribbon
Puerto Rico Civil Disturbance Ribbon
Puerto Rico Disaster Relief Ribbon
Puerto Rico Active Duty for Training Ribbon

== See also ==
- List of Puerto Ricans
- List of superintendents of the Puerto Rico Police
- List of Puerto Rican military personnel
- Puerto Rico Adjutant General

== Notes ==
Military offices
Preceded by Major General William Miranda Marín	Adjutant General of the Puerto Rico National Guard; Under Governor Pedro Rosselló; 1993 - 2001	Succeeded by Major General Francisco A. Márquez
Police appointments
Preceded by José Luis Rivera Díaz	Superintendent of the Puerto Rico Police; 2011–2012	Succeeded by Héctor Pesquera
