= Troop command =

A troop command is a US Army command equivalent in size to a brigade that provides command and control headquarters and planning staff for smaller units of a National Guard within a state that are not organized under a division or brigade headquarters. Troop commands typically provide logistical and administrative support for non-organic units deploying MTOE in the district that are not structured under another formation headquarters. They also provide administrative support to units from other formations within their respective state that are stationed a long way from their higher headquarters. Troop commands train and prepare units to deploy to support both civil defense, national emergency, disaster assistance and overseas missions.

== Troop commands ==
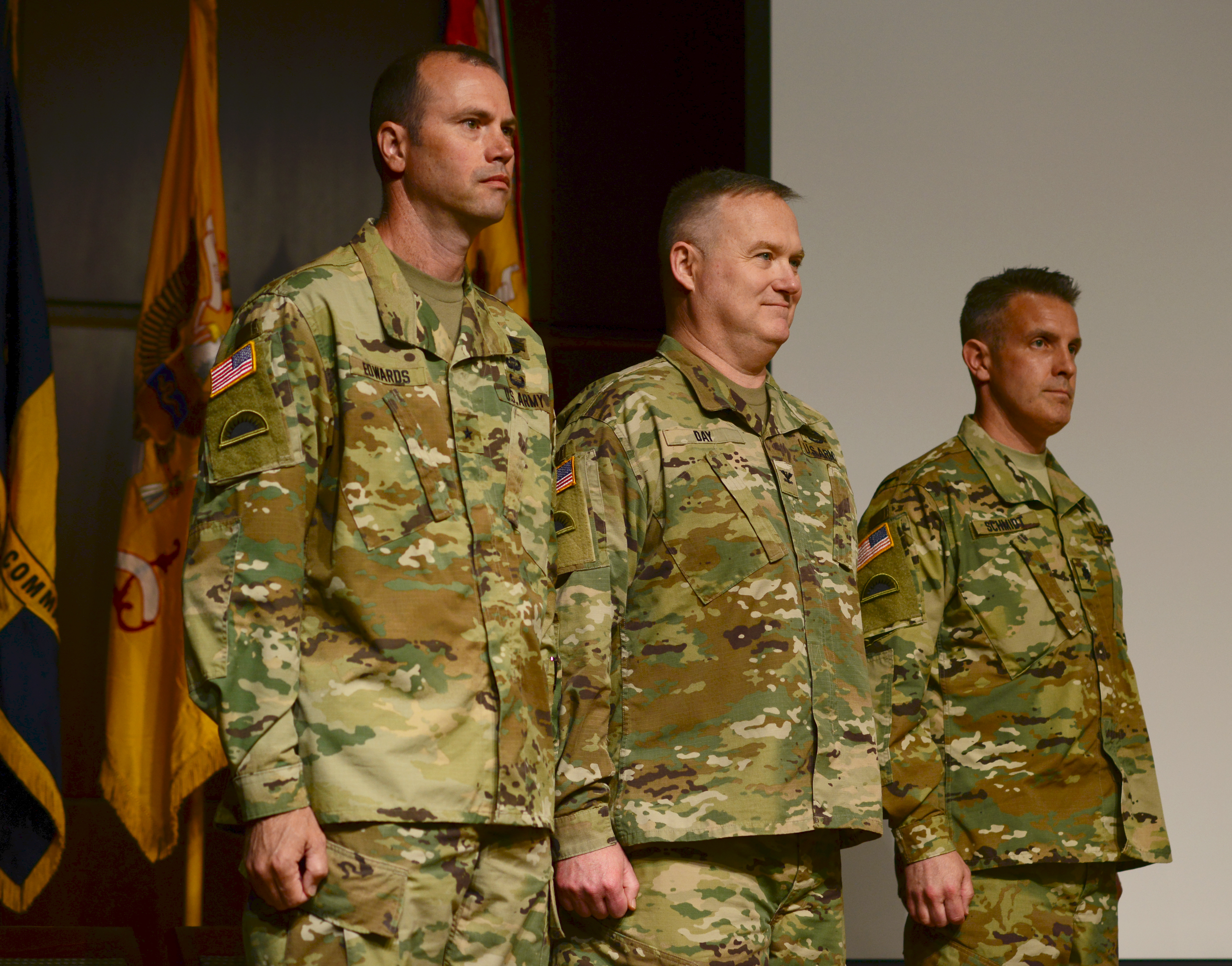
Oregon Army National Guard Brig. Gen. William J. Edwards (left), Land Component Commander; Col. Gregory T. Day (center), outgoing commander; and Lt. Col. (promotable) Stephen L. Schmidt (right), incoming commander, stand at attention during the beginning of a change of command ceremony for the 82nd Brigade (Troop Command), June 3, 2017, at Camp Withycombe in Clackamas, Oregon.

- 30th Troop Command (Tennessee Army National Guard)
- 38th Troop Command (Alaska Army National Guard)
- 53rd Troop Command (New York Army National Guard)
- 54th Troop Command (New Hampshire Army National Guard)
- 56th Troop Command (Rhode Island Army National Guard)
- 57th Troop Command (New Jersey Army National Guard)
- 58th Troop Command (Maryland Army National Guard)
- 59th Troop Command (South Carolina Army National Guard)
- 60th Troop Command (North Carolina Army National Guard)
- 61st Troop Command (Louisiana Army National Guard)
- 63rd Troop Command (Michigan Army National Guard)
- 64th Troop Command (Wisconsin Army National Guard)
- 65th Troop Command (Illinois Army National Guard)
- 66th Troop Command (Mississippi Army National Guard)
- 67th Troop Command (Iowa Army National Guard)
- 68th Troop Command (North Dakota Army National Guard)
- 69th Troop Command (Kansas Army National Guard)
- 70th Troop Command (Missouri Army National Guard)
- 71st Troop Command (Texas Army National Guard)
- 72nd Troop Command (Delaware Army National Guard)
- 73rd Troop Command (Ohio Army National Guard)
- 74th Troop Command (District of Columbia Army National Guard)
- 75th Troop Command (Kentucky Army National Guard)
- 77th Troop Command (West Virginia Army National Guard)
- 78th Troop Command (Georgia Army National Guard)
- 78th Aviation Troop Command (Georgia Army National Guard)
- 79th Troop Command (Massachusetts Army National Guard)
- 81st Troop Command (Indiana Army National Guard)
- 82nd Troop Command (Oregon Army National Guard)
- 83rd Troop Command (Florida Army National Guard)
- 84th Troop Command (Minnesota Army National Guard)
- 85th Troop Command (Connecticut Army National Guard)
- 86th Troop Command (Vermont Army National Guard)
- 87th Troop Command (Arkansas Army National Guard)
- 89th Troop Command (Colorado Army National Guard)
- 90th Troop Command (Oklahoma Army National Guard)
- 92nd Troop Command (Nebraska Army National Guard)
- 93rd Troop Command (New Mexico Army National Guard)
- 94th Troop Command (Wyoming Army National Guard)
- 95th Troop Command (Montana Army National Guard)
- 96th Aviation Troop Command (Washington Army National Guard)
- 97th Troop Command (Utah Army National Guard)
- 98th Aviation Troop Command (Arizona Army National Guard)
- 100th Troop Command (California Army National Guard)
- 101st Troop Command (Puerto Rico Army National Guard)
- 103rd Troop Command (Hawaii Army National Guard)
- 104th Troop Command (Virgin Islands Army National Guard)
- 105th Troop Command (Guam Army National Guard)
- 122nd Troop Command (Alabama Army National Guard)
- 521st Troop Command (Maine Army National Guard)
- 881st Troop Command (South Dakota Army National Guard)
- 992d Troop Command (Nevada Army National Guard)

== States Without Troop Command Units ==
- Idaho Army National Guard
- Pennsylvania Army National Guard
- Virginia Army National Guard (formerly 91st Troop Command - now 91st Cyber Brigade)
