= 296th Infantry Regiment =

Infantry regiment of the Puerto Rico Army National Guard

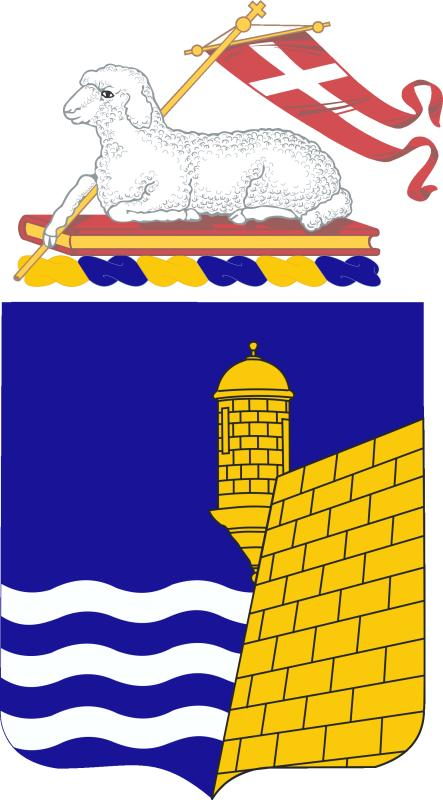
- Coat of arms
- Active: December 26, 1922–May 1, 1964 (41 years of service)
- Disbanded: reorganized as two battalions of the 92nd Infantry Brigade; only its 1st Battalion remains active as part of the 92nd Military police
- Country: United States
- Allegiance: Puerto Rico
- Type: light infantry
- Part of: Puerto Rico Army National Guard
- Garrison/HQ: Mayagüez, Puerto Rico
- Motto: Alerta Está (English: "Alert It Is")
- Engagements: World War I; World War II; Puerto Rican Nationalist Party insurgency; War in Afghanistan; Iraq War

Insignia
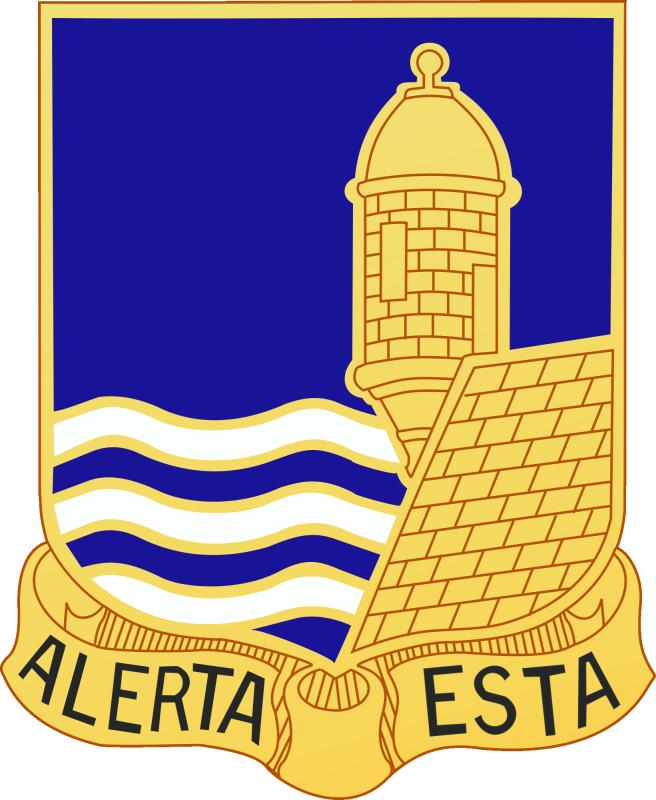
- Distinctive unit insignia

The 296th Infantry Regiment was an infantry regiment of the Puerto Rico Army National Guard consisting mostly of Puerto Rican enlisted soldiers and officers. Today, only its 1st Battalion remains active; being allotted to the 92nd Military Police Brigade of the Puerto Rico Army National Guard. The 296th is composed by the first battalion of infantrymen that engaged in combat as a Puerto Rico National Guard unit, as the 65th Infantry Regiment was, at the time, a regular Army unit. It is one of several National Guard units with colonial roots.

== History ==
The 296th traces its history back to the Spanish colonization of the Americas as an infantry militia constituted on May 17, 1765, as part of the reorganization of the Milicias Disciplinadas (English: "Disciplined Militias") decreed by Spain. However, on February 12, 1870, the militia were reduced to en cadre until their disbandment in April 1898 after Puerto Rico was ceded to the United States. (Note: Negroni (1992) pp. 379–381)

Almost two decades after, on 1917 and at the brink of World War I, Puerto Ricans were granted American citizenship. Right after, the President of the Senate of Puerto Rico requested the United States Army to include Puerto Ricans on the draft. At the time, the United States Army was segregated, and, in order to assign more than 18,000 Puerto Ricans that enlisted or were drafted into the Army for the war effort, the Army created an infantry regiment and the Puerto Rico Voluntary Infantry. The regiment was merely a reconstitution of the disbanded Spanish-era militia as an infantry regiment assigned to the Puerto Rico National Guard on April 12, 1917. Two years later, this freshly created regiment was designated as the 1st Infantry Regiment on July 19, 1919. Several years later, somewhen between July 9 and September 13 of 1922, the Puerto Rico National Guard established a new battalion and called it the 1st Battalion, 2nd Infantry Regiment. It is this battalion that gives birth to the 296th as a few months later after being established it was renamed as the 1st Battalion, 296th Infantry Regiment (1-296) on December 26, 1922. A few weeks after, on January 23, 1923, the aforementioned 1st Infantry Regiment was renamed as the 295th Infantry Regiment. This series of events would establish a long parallel history between the 295th and the 296th Infantry Regiments.

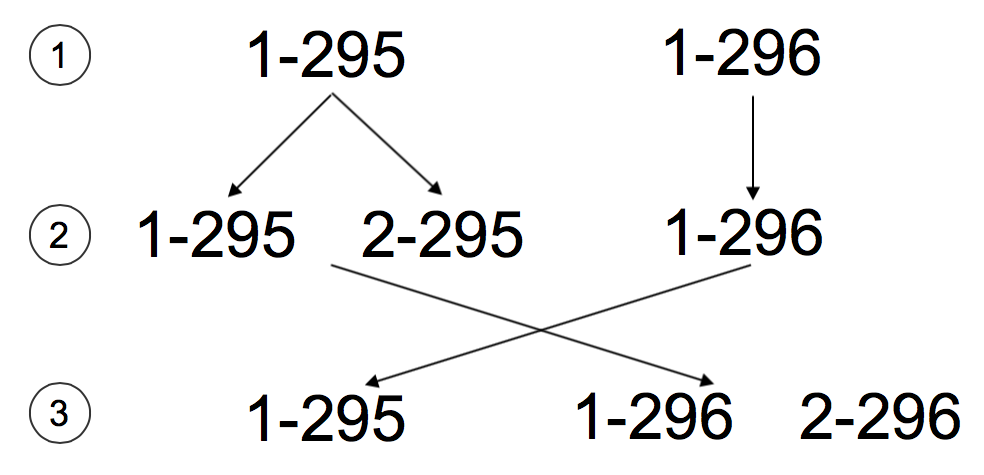
Diagram showing the split of the 295th into the 296th while the 296th becomes the 295th.

On June 1, 1936, another set of organizational changes in the 295th and 296th Infantry Regiments took place. The 1st and 2nd Battalions, 295th Infantry, were redesignated as the 1st and 2nd Battalions, 296th Infantry. The existing 1st Battalion, 296th Infantry (the only unit of the regiment active at that time), was redesignated the 1st Battalion, 295th Infantry. The 296th Infantry subsequently organized its 3rd Battalion from 18-25 August 1940, with the headquarters federally recognized at Ponce. (Note: Negroni (1992; in Spanish) "El 1 de junio de 1936 tuvo lugar una serie de cambios confusos. El 1er y 2do Batallón del Regimiento 295 fueron rebautizados como el Regimiento 296 de Infantería. Entretanto el 1er Batallón del Regimiento 296 formó el nuevo Regimiento 295 de Infantería." p. 379) (Note: Negroni (1992; in Spanish) "El 1 de junio de 1936 [...] el 1er Batallón del 295 se dividió en dos batallones y [pasaron] a llamarse Regimiento 296 de Infantería." p. 380)

After such establishment, on August 25, 1940, the 296th, together with the 295th, formed the new 92nd Infantry Brigade. The 296th deployed to the Panama Canal on 12 January 1944, then returned to Puerto Rico in April 1945, then soon deployed to Hawaii, arriving on 25 June 1945.

After WWII, the 296th simply served as the sister National Guard regiment of the 65th Infantry Regiment. With the outbreak of the Korean War in June 1950, the 65th Infantry Regiment was ordered to Korea. While the 65th Infantry Regiment was on its way, the 296th was mobilized on September 14, 1952, so that it could provide replacements to its sister company deployed in Korea, like many other National Guards did.

The regiment then suffered a series of mobilizations, inactivations, and reorganizations that ultimately dissolved it as a regiment on May 1, 1964. The regiment was simply reorganized as two battalions of the 92nd Infantry Brigade on that date although they maintained their names without an administrative hierarchy as a regiment. Finally, on December 31, 1967, the battalions were reorganized as a single battalion of the 92nd Infantry Brigade. This brigade, in turn, was eventually reorganized as the 92nd Maneuver Enhancement Brigade (92nd MEB) of which the 1st Battalion, 296th Infantry Regiment (1-296) is still part of. The battalion, however, has been allocated at times to the 101st Troop Command when it is needed as a battalion somewhere else without the MEB being deployed with it.

Most recently, the 1st Battalion, 296th Infantry Regiment was deployed in 2002 in support of Operation Enduring Freedom as part of the global war on terrorism. It also deployed to the Iraq War while attached to the 3rd Armored Cavalry Regiment.

== Structure ==
- Executive branch of the government of Puerto Rico & National Guard Bureau & United States Department of the Army
  - Puerto Rico National Guard & Army National Guard
    - Puerto Rico Army National Guard
      - 92nd Military Police Brigade
        - 1st Battalion, 296th Infantry Regiment

== Honors and awards ==

1st row	American Campaign Streamer (Note: Negroni (1992; in Spanish) "El Regimiento 296 tiene la banderola del Teatro Americano y la del Teatro Asiático-Pacífico." p. 381)
2nd row	Asiatic-Pacific Campaign Streamer

== Gallery ==
U.S. Soldiers with the 1st Battalion, 296th Infantry Regiment, Puerto Rico Army National Guard, conduct a skills presentation at Camp Santiago Joint Maneuver Training Center, in Salinas, Puerto Rico, during a change of responsibility and retirement ceremony for the 1st Battalion, 296th Infantry Regiment senior enlisted advisor, Command Sgt. Maj. Angel Alvarado, April 27, 2013.

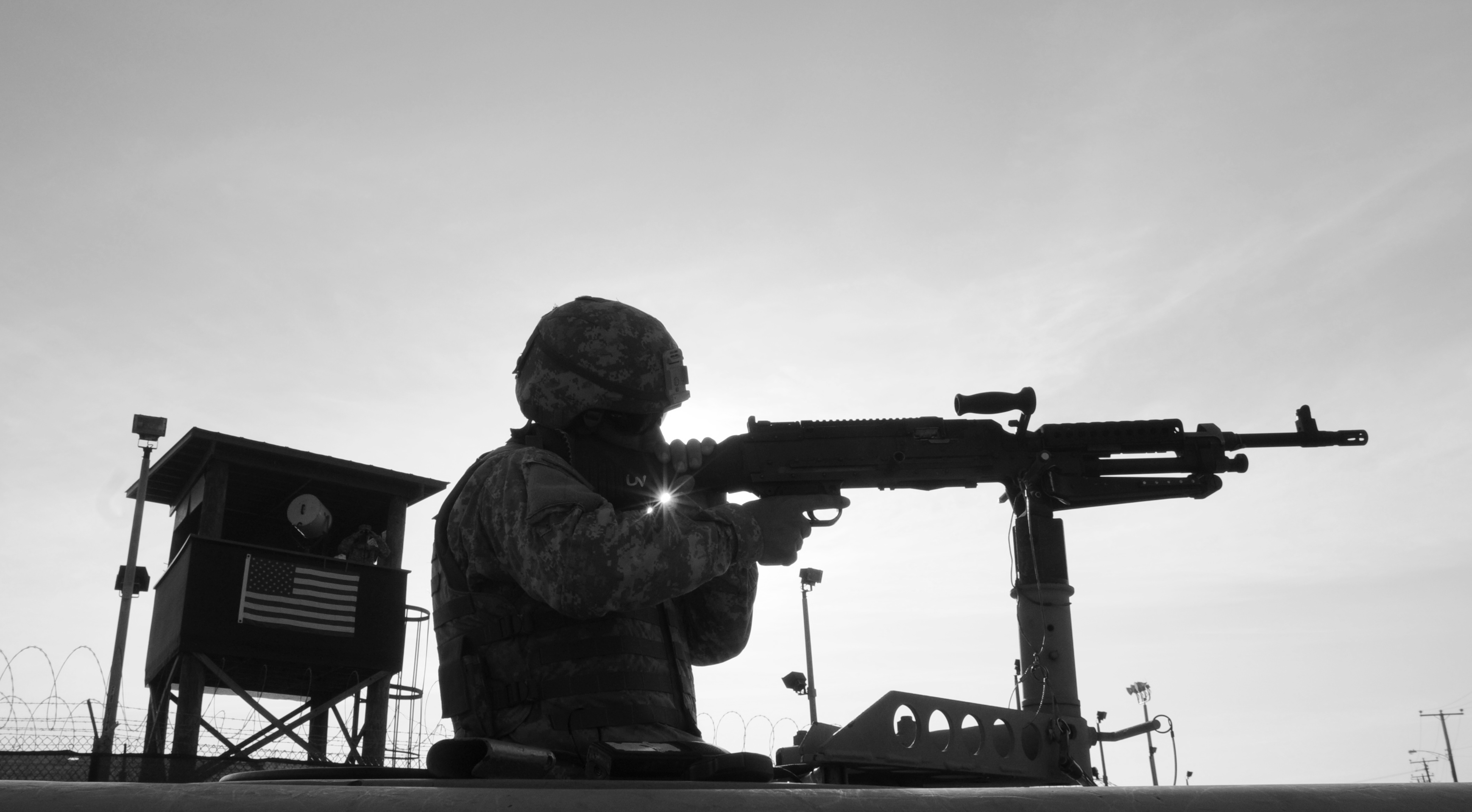
A member of the Puerto Rico Army National Guard, Bravo Company, 1/296th Infantry Regiment patrols outside Camp Delta, December 8, 2010. The regiment is supporting the Joint Task Force Guantanamo mission.

== See also ==
- Military history of Puerto Rico
