= 295th Regiment =

295th Regiment may refer to:

- 295th Guards Motor Rifle Regiment, Russia
- 295th Infantry Regiment, United States
- 295th (Hampshire Carabineers) Heavy Anti-Aircraft Regiment, Royal Artillery
