= Joane Mathews =

American brigadier general

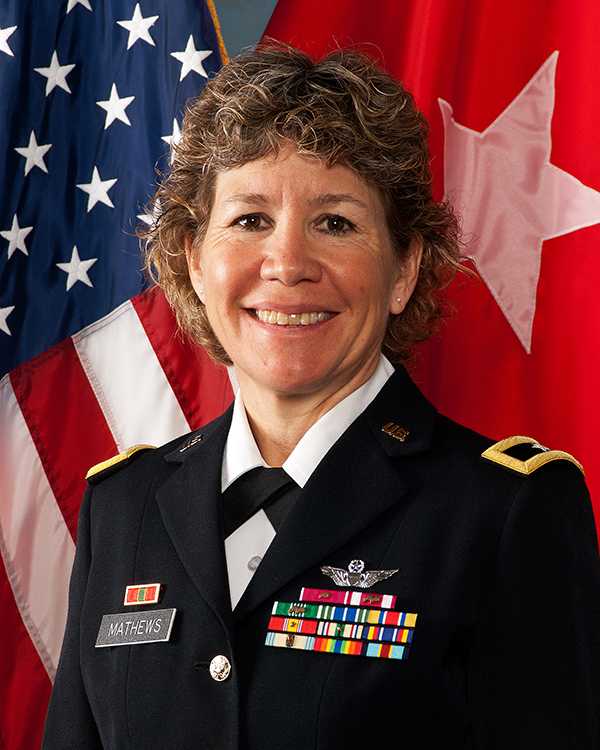
- Joane Mathews in 2016
- Military career
- Allegiance: United States
- Branch: United States Army; United States Army National Guard
- Service years: 1986–2022
- Rank: Brigadier General
- Unit: Wisconsin Army National Guard
- Commands: 64th Troop Command; 1st Battalion, 147th Aviation Regiment
- Conflicts: Operation Provide Comfort
- Awards: Legion of Merit (2); Meritorious Service Medal (3); Army Commendation Medal (3); Army Achievement Medal (2)

Joane K. Mathews is a retired brigadier general in the Wisconsin Army National Guard. A member of the Fish Clan of the Lac du Flambeau Band of Lake Superior Chippewa Indians, she became the first female Native American general officer in the entire Army National Guard.

== Career and education ==
Mathews received her commission in the United States Army through the Reserve Officers' Training Corps in 1986 and was assigned to the United States Army Aviation School. She later flew in several missions during Operation Provide Comfort.

In 1997, Mathews transferred to the Wisconsin Army National Guard. She was named Chief of Staff in 2013. In 2016, Mathews was promoted to brigadier general by Governor Scott Walker and was appointed Assistant Adjutant General for Readiness and Training. In 2020, Mathews was nominated for promotion to major general.

Decorations Mathews has received include the Legion of Merit with oak leaf cluster, Meritorious Service Medal with two oak leaf clusters, the Army Commendation Medal with two oak leaf clusters, the Army Achievement Medal, the National Defense Service Medal and the Master Army Aviator Badge.

Mathews is a graduate of Lakeland Union High School in Minocqua, Wisconsin. Other schools she attended include the University of North Dakota, the United States Army War College and the United States Army Command and General Staff College.

She retired in 2022.
