= Luis Diaz Colon =

Puerto Rican politician (born 1952)

Luis Díaz Colón

Mayor of Yabucoa
- In office January 14, 1993 – January 13, 1997
- Preceded by: Angel Ramos Alveiro
- Succeeded by: Angel Ramos Alveiro

Personal details
- Born: May 1952 (age 74) Yabucoa, Puerto Rico
- Party: New Progressive Party (PNP)

Luis Francisco Diaz Colón (born in May, 1952), also known as "Pickie" Diaz, is a Puerto Rican former politician who served as mayor of Yabucoa from 1993 to 1997. He belonged to the statehood-seeking PNP party. Diaz Colon was also the executive director of the National Parks Company.

== Personal ==
Born to Emilio Díaz Lebron and Margarita Colón, he is the brother of Emilio Diaz Colon.

== See also ==
- List of Puerto Ricans
- Mayors in Puerto Rico
