= 92nd Military Police Brigade =

- The 92nd Military Police Brigade's combat service identification badge
- Active: 24 January 1922–15 February 1959 (various designations in 295th Infantry); 15 February 1959–1 September 2008 (92nd Infantry Brigade); 1 September 2008–1 September 2016 (92nd MEB); 1 September 2016–present (92nd Military Police Bge.)
- Country: United States
- Allegiance: Puerto Rico
- Branch: United States Army National Guard
- Type: Military police
- Size: Brigade
- Part of: Puerto Rico Army National Guard
- Garrison/HQ: Caguas, Puerto Rico
- Motto: A lo que vinimos (English: "To What we came For")
- Colors: Red, blue, and yellow
- Engagements: World War II; American Theater

Commanders
- Current commander: Col. Jose E. Plaza

Insignia
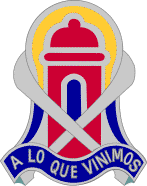
- Distinctive unit insignia

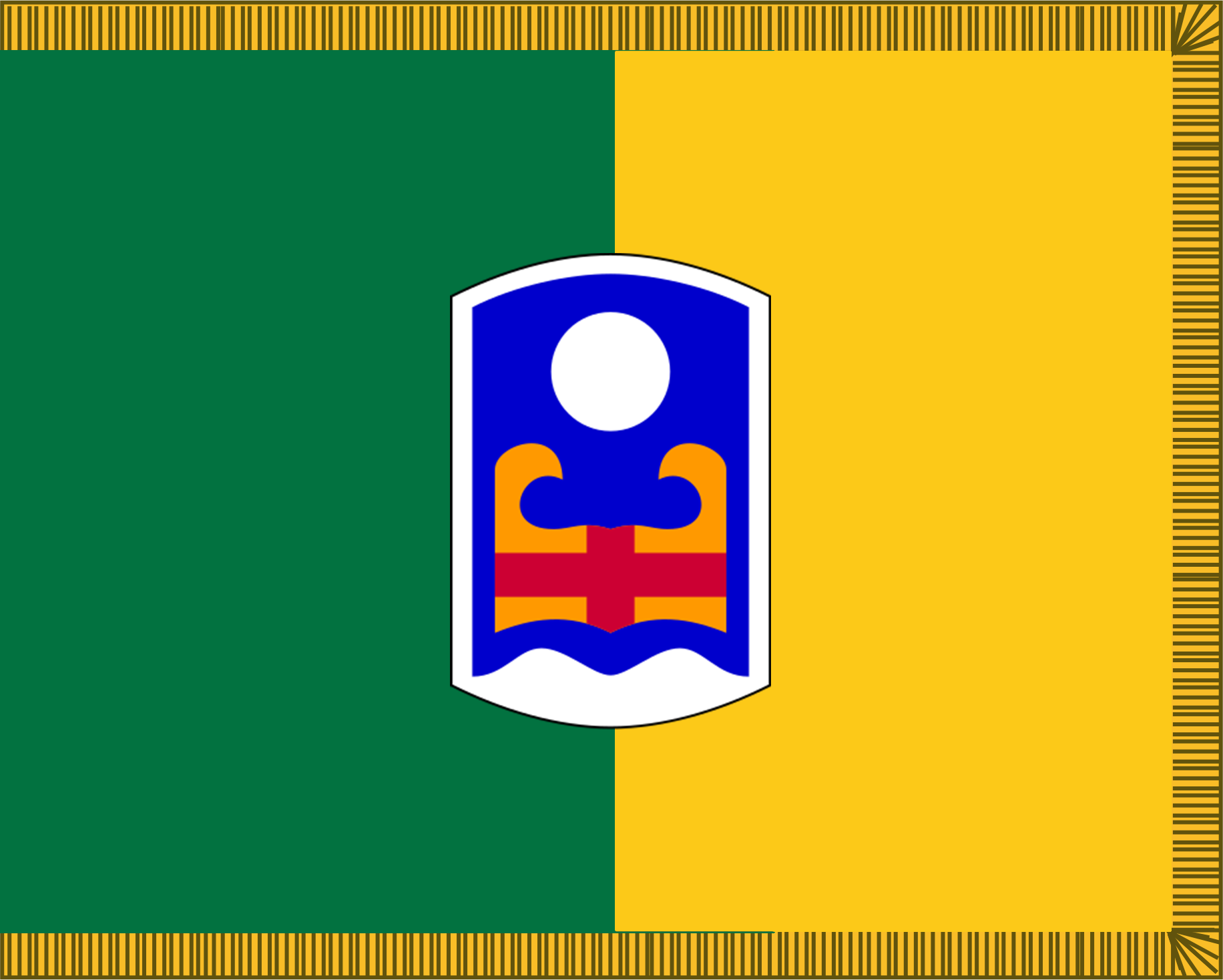
- 92nd Military Police Brigade Flag

The 92nd Military Police Brigade (92nd MP Bde) is a military police brigade of the Puerto Rico Army National Guard. The brigade was formerly an infantry brigade combat team known as the 92nd Infantry Brigade Combat Team and then a Maneuver Enhancement Brigade. It includes two MP battalions, two infantry battalions and some support units.

== History ==
The lineage of the 92nd brigade begins with Puerto Rican National Guard HHC 3d Battalion, 295th Infantry on 24 January 1922. This unit would be redesignated several times generally remaining as a part of the 295th until 1959.

During World War II and on up to the time of the Korean War, the US Army was racially segregated. As a result, the 295th, 296th, and 65th Infantry regiments were all formations consisting mostly of Puerto Rican enlisted men and National Guardsmen.

The 92nd Infantry Brigade was established on 15 February 1959 as a separate combined arms brigade during the Pentomic reorganization of the Puerto Rico Army National Guard, replacing the 295th and 296th Regimental Combat Teams.

The 92nd Infantry Brigade Combat Team reorganized as the 92nd Maneuver Enhancement Brigade on 1 September 2008. The current formation still retains two of the former brigade infantry battalions, which are the 1st battalion of the 296th Infantry Regiment and the 1st battalion of the 65th Infantry Regiment. Other units integrated into the brigade are an additional military police battalion, a combat engineer battalion and several more combat support and combat service support elements. Maneuver Enhancement Brigades is designed to bridge the operational gap between Brigade Combat Teams and Functional Support Brigades. By modern doctrine MEB can control operational areas and are assigned a Tactical Combat Force, usually in the form of a maneuver infantry battalion. A Maneuver Enhancement Brigade mission is to provide the divisional commander with a field grade officer led formation that has a large headquarters, capable of controlling a mix of combat engineer, military police, level II medical services, communication units, NBC units and civil affair units, in addition to its attached maneuver combat battalion for security and rear area defense operations. This transformation is tailored to the needs of the U.S. Army in its role in the war against terrorism. Most of the brigade members are veteran soldiers of several combat activation. The 92nd Maneuver Enhancement Brigade is the largest combat unit in the Puerto Rico ARNG.

The brigade was reorganized as the 92nd Military Police Brigade on 1 September 2016.

== Organization ==
- 92nd Military Police Brigade, in Caguas
  - Headquarters and Headquarters Company, 92nd Military Police Brigade, in Caguas
  - 1st Battalion, 65th Infantry Regiment, in Cayey (part of 79th Infantry Brigade Combat Team)
    - Headquarters and Headquarters Company, 1st Battalion, 65th Infantry Regiment, in Cayey
    - Company A, 1st Battalion, 65th Infantry Regiment, in Aibonito
    - Company B, 1st Battalion, 65th Infantry Regiment, in Guayama
    - Company C, 1st Battalion, 65th Infantry Regiment, in Coamo
    - Company D (Weapons), 1st Battalion, 65th Infantry Regiment, in Cayey
    - Company I (Forward Support), 40th Brigade Support Battalion, in Cayey
  - 1st Battalion, 296th Infantry Regiment, in Mayagüez (part of 33rd Infantry Brigade Combat Team)
    - Headquarters and Headquarters Company, 1st Battalion, 296th Infantry Regiment, in Mayagüez
    - Company A, 1st Battalion, 296th Infantry Regiment, in Utuado
    - Company B, 1st Battalion, 296th Infantry Regiment, in Mayagüez
    - Company C, 1st Battalion, 296th Infantry Regiment, in Cabo Rojo
    - Company D (Weapons), 1st Battalion, 296th Infantry Regiment, in Mayagüez
    - Company I (Forward Support), 634th Brigade Support Battalion, in Mayagüez
  - 124th Military Police Battalion, at Fort Buchanan
    - Headquarters and Headquarters Detachment, 124th Military Police Battalion, at Fort Buchanan
    - 225th Military Police Company (Combat Support), at Fort Buchanan
    - 480th Military Police Company (Combat Support), at Fort Buchanan
  - 125th Military Police Battalion, in Ponce
    - Headquarters and Headquarters Detachment, 125th Military Police Battalion, in Ponce
    - 544th Military Police Company (Combat Support), in Aguadilla
    - 755th Military Police Company (Combat Support), in Arecibo

== Heraldry ==
The shoulder sleeve insignia was authorized on 16 June 1964. The colors blue and white are used for Infantry units in the US Army. The blue area and white wavy base refer to the Caribbean and the white disc to the Island of Puerto Rico, the white disc also simulating a pearl. The furison, a steel device for striking against flint to create a fire, is an ancient heraldic symbol and simulates a battle sight on a rifle. Furisons also form links in the collar of the Order of the Golden Fleece, the foremost Spanish order of chivalry, and refer to the discovery and settlement of Puerto Rico by the Spanish. In this instance, the blue area within the furison refers to San Juan Harbor, the opening between the arms of the furison alluding to "puerto" a harbor and the yellow furison itself to the surrounding land area and natural opulence of the island. The cross on the furison alludes to San Juan and appears on the banner in the crest of the Puerto Rican National Guard. The cross in this instance is red, yellow and red being the colors of Spain.

The distinctive unit insignia was authorized for the noncolor bearing units of the 92nd Infantry Brigade on 19 April 1967, with the motto amended on 12 June 1967. The red sentry tower was suggested by El Morro at San Juan and the yellow disc alludes to the tropical sun, red and yellow also being the colors of the Spanish who discovered and first settled in Puerto Rico. The machetes refer to the cutting of sugar cane, a major source of wealth in the Island, and are also extremely effective offensive weapons. Crossed in front of the sentry tower, they allude to constant vigilance and readiness to defend Puerto Rico. Blue, red and yellow are also the colors of the three major combat arms and the motto "A Lo Que Vinimos" may be translated to "What we came for".

== See also ==
- Military history of Puerto Rico
- Puerto Rico Adjutant General
