= 295th Infantry Regiment =

Light infantry regiment of the Puerto Rico Army National Guard

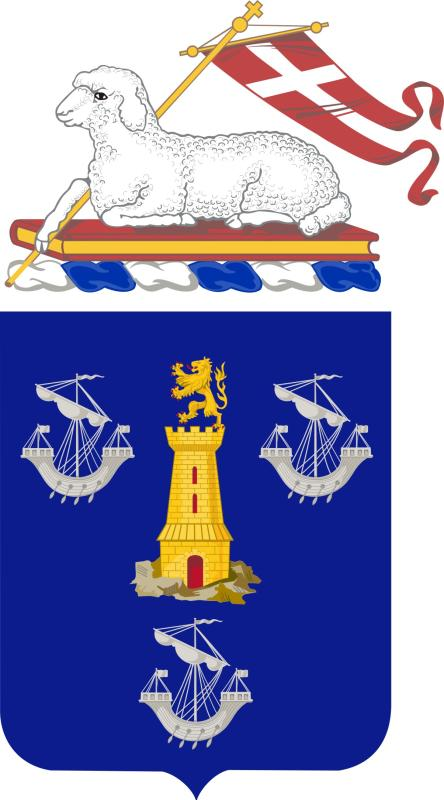
- Coat of arms
- Founded: January 23, 1923
- Disbanded: May 1, 1964
- Country: United States
- Allegiance: Puerto Rico
- Type: Light infantry
- Part of: Puerto Rico Army National Guard
- Garrison/HQ: Puerto Rico
- Motto: Todo Por La Patria (English: "All For The Motherland")
- Engagements: World War I; World War II; War in Afghanistan; Iraq War

Insignia
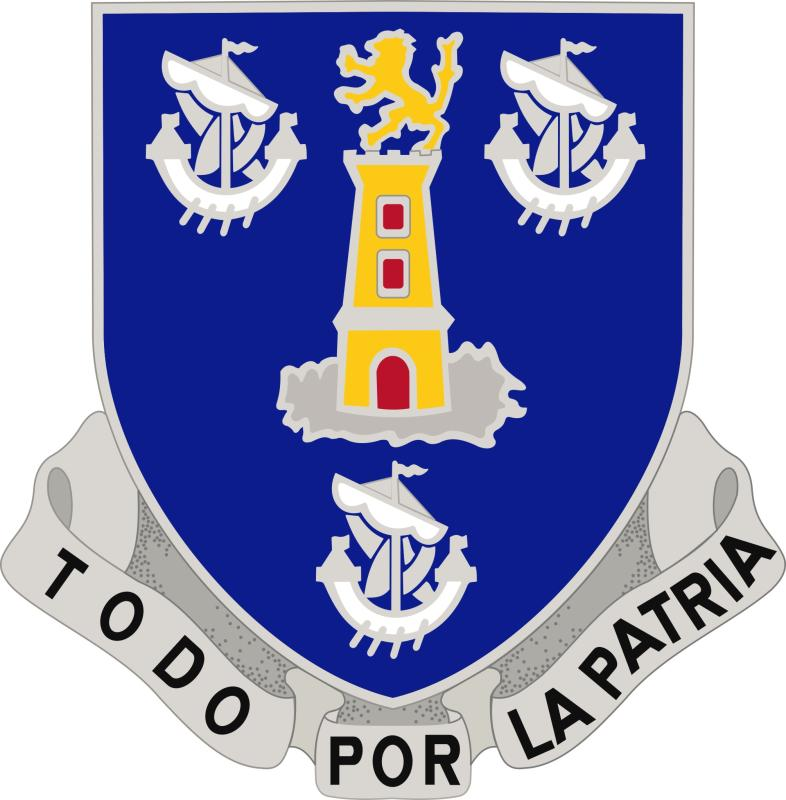
- Distinctive unit insignia

The 295th Infantry Regiment was a light infantry regiment of the Puerto Rico Army National Guard consisting mostly of Puerto Rican enlisted soldiers and officers. The regiment was the first regiment of any kind assigned to the Puerto Rico National Guard back when it was known locally as the 1st Infantry Regiment. (Note: The regiment was quickly renamed to 295th Infantry Regiment so as to not be confused with the 1st Infantry Regiment of the regular United States Army.)

== History ==
The 295th traces its history back to the Spanish colonization of the Americas as an infantry militia constituted on May 17, 1762, as part of the reorganization of the Milicias Disciplinadas (English: "Disciplined Militias") decreed by Spain. However, on February 12, 1870, the militia were reduced to en cadre until their disbandment in April 1898 after Puerto Rico was ceded to the United States. (Note: Negroni (1992) pp. 379–381)

=== World War I ===
Almost two decades after, on 1917 and at the brink of World War I, Puerto Ricans were granted American citizenship. Right after, the President of the Senate of Puerto Rico requested the United States Army to include Puerto Ricans on the draft. At the time, the United States Army was segregated, and, in order to assign more than 18,000 Puerto Ricans that enlisted or were drafted into the Army for the war effort, the Army created an infantry regiment and the Puerto Rico Voluntary Infantry. The regiment was merely a reconstitution of the disbanded Spanish-era militia as an infantry regiment assigned to the Puerto Rico National Guard on April 12, 1917.

=== Interwar period ===
Two years later, this freshly created regiment was designated as the 1st Infantry Regiment on July 19, 1919. Several years later, somewhen between July 9 and September 13 of 1922, the Puerto Rico National Guard established a new battalion and called it the 1st Battalion, 2nd Infantry Regiment. A few months later, the battalion was renamed as the 1st Battalion, 296th Infantry Regiment (1-296) on December 26, 1922. A few weeks later, on January 23, 1923, the aforementioned 1st Infantry Regiment was renamed as the 295th Infantry Regiment. This series of events would establish a long parallel history between the 295th and the 296th Infantry Regiments.

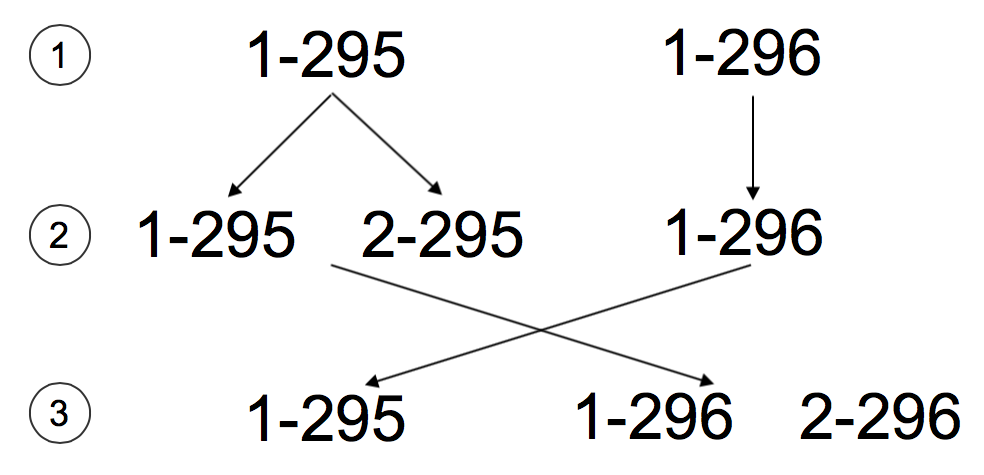
Diagram showing the split of the 295th into the 296th while the 296th becomes the 295th.

On June 1, 1936, another set of organizational changes in the 295th and 296th Infantry Regiments took place. The 1st and 2nd Battalions, 295th Infantry, were redesignated as the 1st and 2nd Battalions, 296th Infantry. The existing 1st Battalion, 296th Infantry (the only unit of the regiment active at that time), was redesignated the 1st Battalion, 295th Infantry. The 295th Infantry was subsequently expanded to two battalions by the recruitment of the 2nd Battalion in central and northern Puerto Rico. The 3rd Battalion was organized from 18 to 25 August 1940 and federally recognized at San Juan. (Note: Negroni (1992; in Spanish) "El 1 de junio de 1936 tuvo lugar una serie de cambios confusos. El 1er y 2do Batallón del Regimiento 295 fueron rebautizados como el Regimiento 296 de Infantería. Entretanto el 1er Batallón del Regimiento 296 formó el nuevo Regimiento 295 de Infantería." p. 379) (Note: Negroni (1992; in Spanish) "El 1 de junio de 1936 [...] el 1er Batallón del 295 se dividió en dos batallones y [pasaron] a llamarse Regimiento 296 de Infantería." p. 380)

A few years later, on January 1, 1944, the regiment was activated and served in the American Theater of war in the Panama Canal Zone until February 20, 1946.

The regiment then suffered a series of mobilizations, inactivations, and reorganizations that ultimately dissolved it as a regiment on May 1, 1964. The regiment was simply reorganized as two battalions of the 92nd Infantry Brigade on that date although they maintained their names without an administrative hierarchy as a regiment. Finally, on December 31, 1967, the battalions were reorganized as a single battalion of the 92nd Infantry Brigade. The battalion, however, was eventually allocated to the 101st Troop Command.

Most recently, Company C, 1st Battalion, 295th Infantry Regiment (C/1-295) spent a year running security escort missions throughout southern Iraq and security patrols around Baghdad International Airport as part of Operation Iraqi Freedom in 2006.

== Structure ==
- Executive branch of the government of Puerto Rico & National Guard Bureau & United States Department of the Army
  - Puerto Rico National Guard & Army National Guard
    - Puerto Rico Army National Guard
      - 101st Troop Command
        - 1st Battalion, 295th Infantry Regiment

== Honors and awards ==
Streamer for American Campaign Medal

| 1st row | American Campaign Streamer (Note: Negroni (1992; in Spanish) "El Regimiento 295 de Infantería tiene la banderola de campaña del Teatro Americano." p. 380) |

== See also ==
- Military history of Puerto Rico
