= 130th Engineer Battalion =

Combat engineer battalion of the Puerto Rico Army National Guard

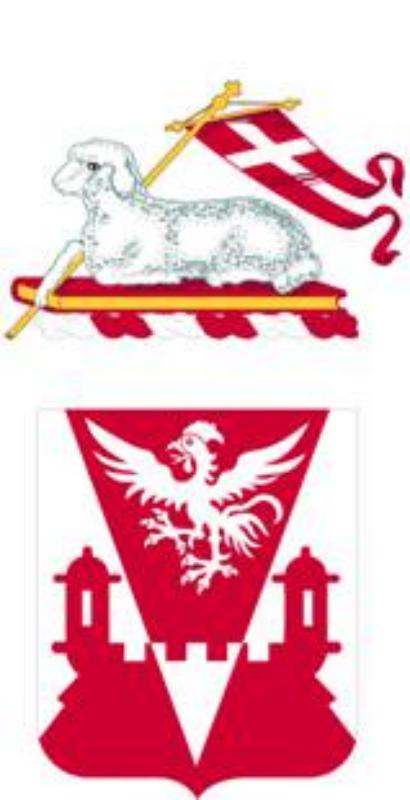
- coat of arms
- Founded: 6 February 1959; 67 years ago
- Country: United States
- Allegiance: Constitution of the United States
- Branch: United States Army National Guard
- Type: light infantry
- Role: combat engineering
- Size: battalion
- Part of: 101st Troop Command
- Garrison/HQ: Vega Baja, Puerto Rico
- Motto: Skill And Strength
- Engagements: World War II; Afghanistan War; Iraq War

Commanders
- Current commander: LTC Edil Velázquez
- Notable commanders: Emilio Díaz Colón

Insignia
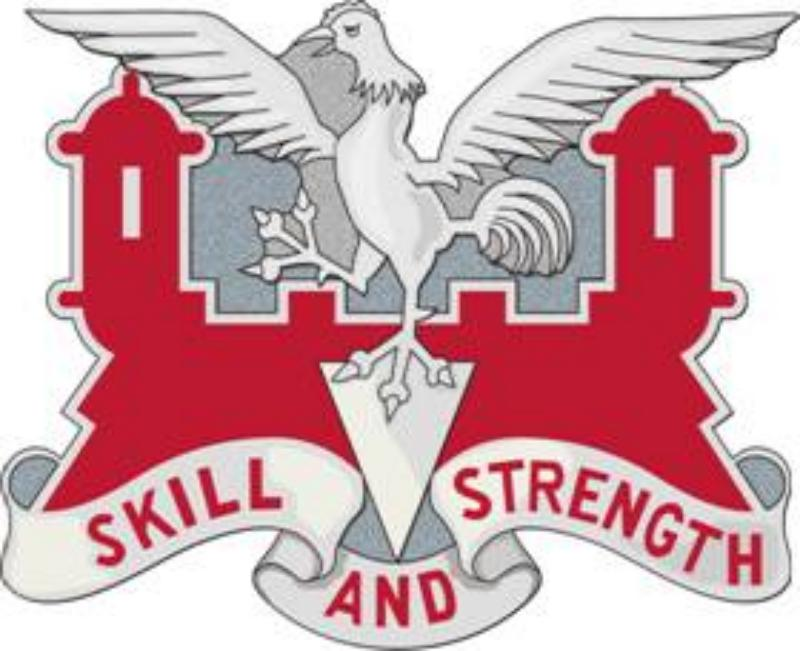
- Distinctive Unit Insignia

The 130th Engineer Battalion (130th EN BN) is a combat engineer battalion of the Puerto Rico Army National Guard allocated to the 101st Troop Command. The 130th is one of the most decorated battalions of the Puerto Rico National Guard with two Presidential Unit Citations, one Meritorious Unit Commendation, thirty five Purple Hearts, one Silver Star Medal, twenty six Bronze Star Medals, and four hundred and sixty nine Army Commendation Medals.

== History ==
Constituted 6 February 1959 in the Puerto Rico Army National Guard as the 126th Engineer Battalion.

Organized and Federally recognized 15 February 1959 from existing units with headquarters in Carolina, Puerto Rico.

Redesignated 1 May 1959 as the 130th Engineer Battalion.

Location of headquarters changed 31 December 1967 to Vega Baja, Puerto Rico.

Ordered into active Federal service 11 February 2003 at home stations; released from active Federal service 21 May 2003 and reverted to territorial control.

Ordered into active Federal service 23 July 2006 at home stations; released from active Federal service 18 January 2008 and reverted to territorial control. The 130th Eng. Bn. completed more than 1,500 combat patrol missions in Iraq, more than 44,000 miles of roads traveled and recon, 16,500 interrogations conducted, 7,300 hours expended in IED search throughout Baghdad and found and deactivated more than 280 IEDs.

Reorganized 1 September 2008 to consist of the headquarters and the Support Company (Companies A, B, C and D concurrently reorganized and redesignated as the 1013th Engineer Company, the 1014th Engineer Company, the 1011th Engineer Company, the 1010th Engineer Company and the 215th Fire Fighter Engineer Detachment, respectively hereafter separate lineages).

== Organization ==
- 130th Engineer Battalion, in Vega Baja
  - Headquarters and Headquarters Company, 130th Engineer Battalion, in Vega Baja
  - Forward Support Company, 130th Engineer Battalion, in Vega Baja
  - 215th Engineer Detachment (Fire Fighting Team — Fire Truck)
  - 1010th Engineer Company (Engineer Construction Company)
  - 1011th Engineer Company (Vertical Construction Company)
  - 1014th Engineer Company (Sapper)

== Honors and awards ==
=== Unit ===

	Award	Embroidery
1st row	Presidential Unit Citation (Army)	IRAQ
2nd row	Presidential Unit Citation (Navy)	IRAQ 2003
3rd row	Meritorious Unit Commendation (Army)	SOUTHWEST ASIA 2006–2007
4th row	American Campaign Streamer	N/A
5th row	Afghanistan Campaign Streamer	N/A
6th row	Iraq Campaign Streamer	N/A

=== Individuals ===
Award	Name	Total
	Purple Heart	34
	Silver Star	1
	Bronze Star	26
	Army Commendation Medal with "V" device	13
	Army Commendation Medal	469
	Combat Medic Badge	12
	Combat Action Badge	313
