= 64th Troop Command =

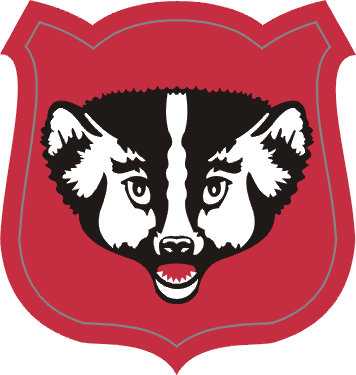
- Shoulder patch of units in the 64th Troop Command
- Country: United States
- Allegiance: Wisconsin
- Branch: Army National Guard
- Role: Sustainment
- Size: 1,700
- Garrison/HQ: Madison, Wisconsin

Commanders
- Commander: COL Kurt Southworth
- Command Sergeant Major: CSM Terri Vollrath

Insignia
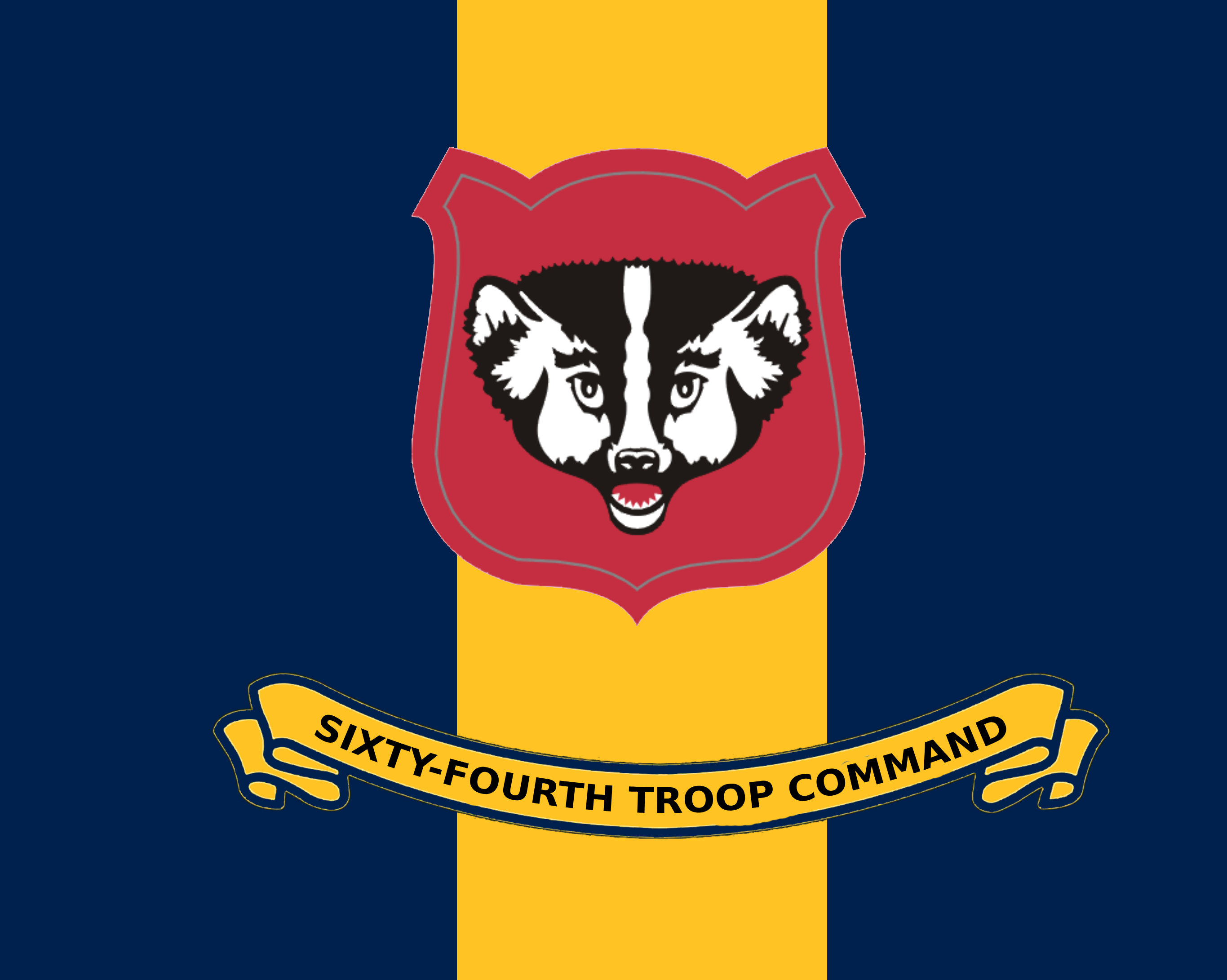
- Wisconsin Army National Guard 64th Troop Command Flag

The 64th Troop Command is a Troop command of the Wisconsin Army National Guard. It is one of the four major units of the Wisconsin Army National Guard. The 64th Troop Command provides administrative, training and logistical support to unique, specialized or smaller Wisconsin Army National Guard units that are not part of other major deployable units. With an authorized strength of more than 1,700 Soldiers, the command includes aviation, sustainment and support, personnel, military police, band, transportation, maintenance, public affairs, rear area operations command, and medical units.

== Structure ==
64th Troop Command

- Headquarters and Headquarters Detachment - Madison
- 54th Civil Support Team (CST)

732nd Combat Sustainment Support Battalion

- Headquarters and Headquarters Detachment - Tomah
- 107th Maintenance Company - Sparta
  - Detachment 1, 107th Maintenance Company - Viroqua
- 1157th Transportation Company - Oshkosh
- 1158th Transportation Company - Beloit
  - Detachment 1, 1158th Transportation Company - Black River Falls

641st Troop Command Battalion

- Headquarters and Headquarters Detachment - Madison
- Wisconsin Medical Detachment - Camp Douglas
- 112th Mobile Public Affairs Detachment - Madison
- 132nd Army Band - Madison
- 135th Medical Company - Waukesha
- 273rd Engineer Company (SAPPER) - Medford
- 457th Chemical Company - Whitewater
- 1967th Contingency Contracting Team - Camp Douglas
- Detachment 1, 176th Cyber Protection Team - Madison

1st Battalion, 147th Aviation Regiment

- Headquarters and Headquarters Company - Madison
- Company A - Madison
  - Detachment 1, Company C - Madison
- Company D - Madison
- Company E - Madison

West Bend Aviation

- Detachment 1, Company B, 248th Aviation Support Bn. - West Bend
