= Camp Santiago Joint Training Center =

Military training installation in Salinas, Puerto Rico

- Part of Puerto Rico National Guard
- Salinas, Puerto Rico
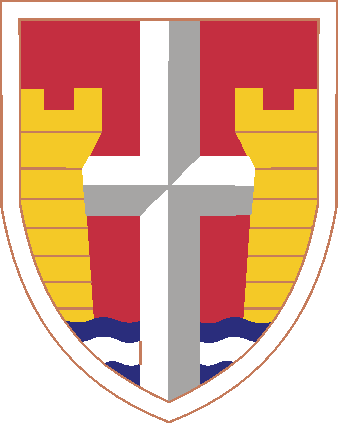
- Camp Santiago Joint Training Center

Site information
- Type: Military training installation
- Controlled by: Puerto Rico National Guard

Location
- Coordinates: 17.9903°N 66.2858°W

Site history
- Built: 1940
- In use: 1940 - present

Garrison information
- Current commander: LTC Danny Segarra
- Garrison: 92nd Maneuver Enhancement Brigade

Camp Santiago Joint Training Center is a military training installation controlled by the Puerto Rico National Guard on 6,500 hectares (16,000 acres) of land located in Salinas, Puerto Rico. This training facility was named posthumously after Medal of Honor recipient and native of Salinas, Puerto Rico, Specialist Four Héctor Santiago-Colón.

== History ==
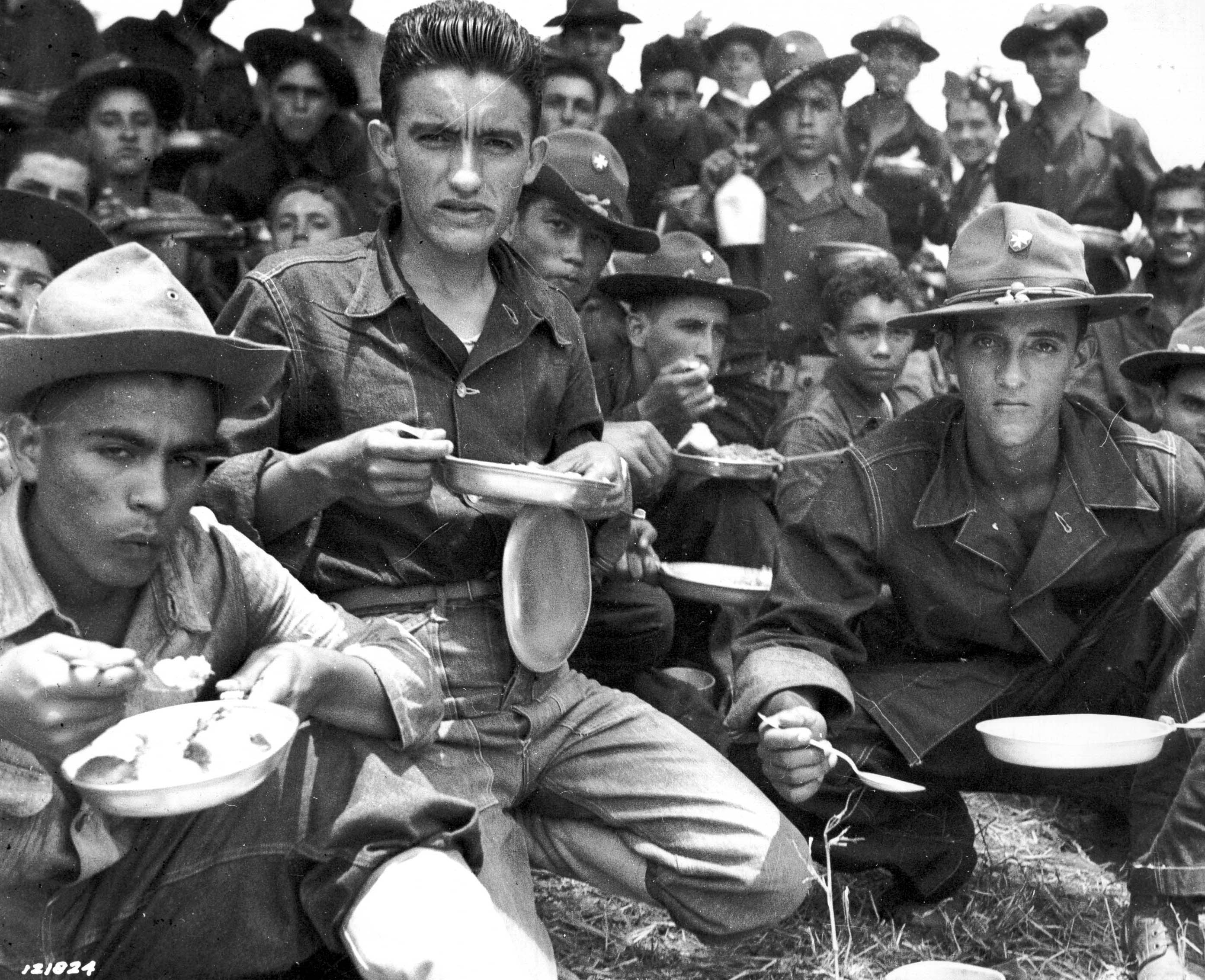
Soldiers of the 65th Infantry Regiment chow during a day of training in Salinas, Puerto Rico. August 1941.

Camp Santiago was acquired from the Commonwealth of Puerto Rico in 1940 by the United States Army for training and was originally established as the Salinas Training Area. In 1967, the U.S. Government licensed the camp to the Puerto Rico National Guard. Since that time the camp has grown from a tent city with very few permanent facilities to an installation of more than 300 buildings of approximately 66,489 square metres (715,680 sq ft).

In 1941 the 65th Infantry Regiment 3rd Battalion was the first combat unit to train at this Southern Puerto Rico military camp before being sent to Panama to protect the Panama Canal during World War II.

In 1966 Col. Alberto A. Nido requested the construction of a range, the National Guard Bureau approved the construction at the cost of $10,000. Captain Gabriel I. Peñagarícano was assigned project officer and the U.S. Army Antilles Command caretakers of the camp, provided earth-moving equipment and personnel. In 1974, Campamento Santiago's air strip was renamed after administrative official Manuel Collazo.

In 1975, the camp was renamed as Camp Santiago after Fourth Class Specialist Héctor Santiago Colón from Salinas, Puerto Rico, a posthumous Medal of Honor recipient. The soldier died at the Qtuang Tri Province, South Vietnam on June 28, 1968, while serving for 1st Cavalry Division, 7th Cavalry, Company B, 5th Battalion, and became famous for trying to shield his comrades from a grenade with his own body. The installation used for training of the Puerto Rico National Guard was formally named "Campamento Santiago" pursuant to an order issued by the General Quarters of the United States Army on July 1, 1975. This marked the second instance that a military installation in Puerto Rico was renamed after a local soldier after Campamento García in Vieques was named after Fernando García. Major General Carlos Chardón was actively involved in the process to propose the recognition. The Cal. 45 shooting range at Campanento Santiago was named after Col. Eduardo Andino, a distinguished pistol and rifle shooter that won a U.S. Army National Pistol Championship in 1922.

From 1990 to 1991, military units in Puerto Rico such as the 92nd Maneuver Enhancement Brigade reported to Camp Santiago for initial training in preparation before deployment to Operation Desert Storm in Kuwait. Camp Santiago also had a role in training National Guard and Reserve soldiers in Puerto Rico for Operation Enduring Freedom during the War in Afghanistan (2001–2021). In 2006 more soldiers went back to Camp Santiago to prepare for the Iraq War during Operation Desert Shield.

The U.S. Navy had a radio station receiver site at Camp Santiago.

The Puerto Rico Department of Corrections and Rehabilitation held initial correctional guard training academy at Camp Santiago until 1996.

Camp Santiago also served as an Athletes' Villages for the 1993 Central American and Caribbean Games in Ponce and the 2010 Central American and Caribbean Games in Mayagüez.

Following the events of Hurricane Maria in 2017, Camp Santiago JTC suffered damages, the Puerto Rico National Guard received an injection of $500 million to improve and repair post facilities the due to the force of the hurricane.

In 2025 Camp Santiago served as a training ground for the United States military buildup in the Caribbean during Operation Southern Spear. Some of the units that had training operations at Camp Santiago were the 3rd Battalion, 6th Marines of the 22nd Marine Expeditionary Unit (22nd MEU).

== Installation ==
Camp Santiago Joint Training Center (CSJTC) is located 82 kilometres (51 mi) south of San Juan, the capital of Puerto Rico. The main gate is located right off Puerto Rico Highway 52 on exit 65, the camp is easily accessible from almost everywhere in Puerto Rico. Though it has no permanent residents, Camp Santiago can house thousands of troops on a temporarily basis. Some old barracks were demolished and replaced with new barracks; Other facilities include the Sustainment Automation Support Management Office (SASMO), a Puerto Rico National Guard Museum, Theater, Dining Facilities, Base Chapel, Fire Station, a pool for recreation and water training exercises, a cyber café (computer classroom/laboratory), Troop Medical Clinic, The Brig Gen. Victor J. Torres Fitness Center, ID Card office, MWR Community Center and AAFES post exchange and gas station on base.

Training facilities at Camp Santiago include Virtual Convoy Operations Trainer (OCOT), Call For Fire Trainer (CFFT), Engage Similation Training (EST2000), Maneuver Area Training Equipment Site (MATES), 2HMMWV Engress Assistance Trainer (HEAT), FOB Compound Area, EID Path Zoo, a new Rappelling Tower, AWTs, Pre-mob Training Area, Multi-Purpose Machine Gun Range and an Urban Assault Range (UAR). Future projects for the Camp Santiago Joint Maneuver Training Center (CSJMTC) includes a land navigation course, a live shooting house, and a military pistol qualification range.

Warriors Plaza was inaugurated on September 11, 2011, to commemorate the 10th anniversary of the September 11, 2001 9/11 tragedy and honor all the service members of the Puerto Rico National Guard who were mobilized to the New York area to respond to the search and rescue mission.

== Current use ==
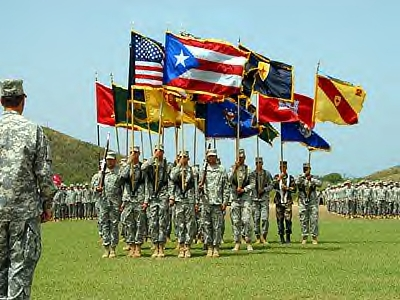
Puerto Rico Army National Guard soldiers present the colors at the 2012 annual training closing ceremonies at Camp Santiago, PR.

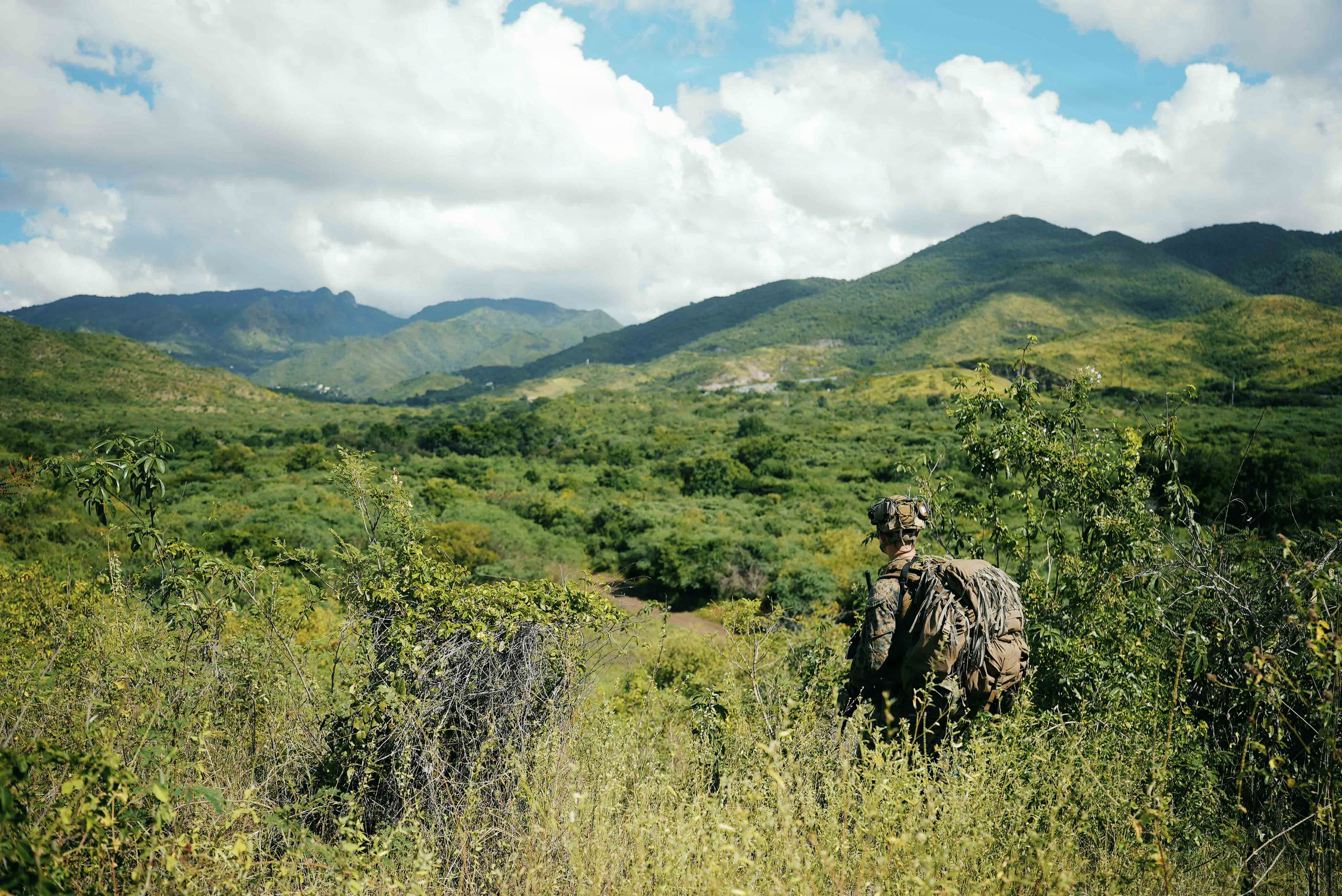
3rd Battalion, 6th Marines during an exercise in Camp Santiago during Operation Southern Spear, December 3, 2025

Camp Santiago is the primary training area for the United States Army, Army National Guard, United States Army Reserve, United States Marine Corps Reserve and the Air National Guard in Puerto Rico. The camp is used for Annual Field Training Exercises (FTX) each summer and for monthly drills throughout the year. Some Army National Guard and Army Reserve units from the Continental United States (CONUS) also come to Camp Santiago for their annual training camp. The only permanent units at Camp Santiago are the 1600th Ordnance Company and the 770th Transportation Company. The Army ROTC and the Air Force ROTC hold their semester training exercises at Camp Santiago.

Camp Santiago is open to the general public for the annual Puerto Rico National Guard Family Day held each February.

The Puerto Rico Rifle and Pistol Association hold their state championship every year at Camp Santiago, with participants from the military, law enforcement agencies, and civilian organizations. Federal and state law enforcement agencies use Camp Santiago as a support facility for operations in southern Puerto Rico. Military youth groups such as the Civil Air Patrol and the United States Naval Sea Cadet Corps conduct Summer Encampment at Camp Santiago.

== See also ==
- Army National Guard
- Air National Guard
- Puerto Rico National Guard
- Military of Puerto Rico
