= 54th Troop Command =

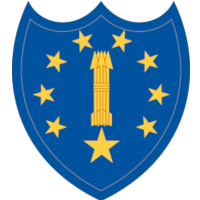
- Country: United States
- Allegiance: New Hampshire
- Branch: Army National Guard
- Garrison/HQ: Concord

Insignia
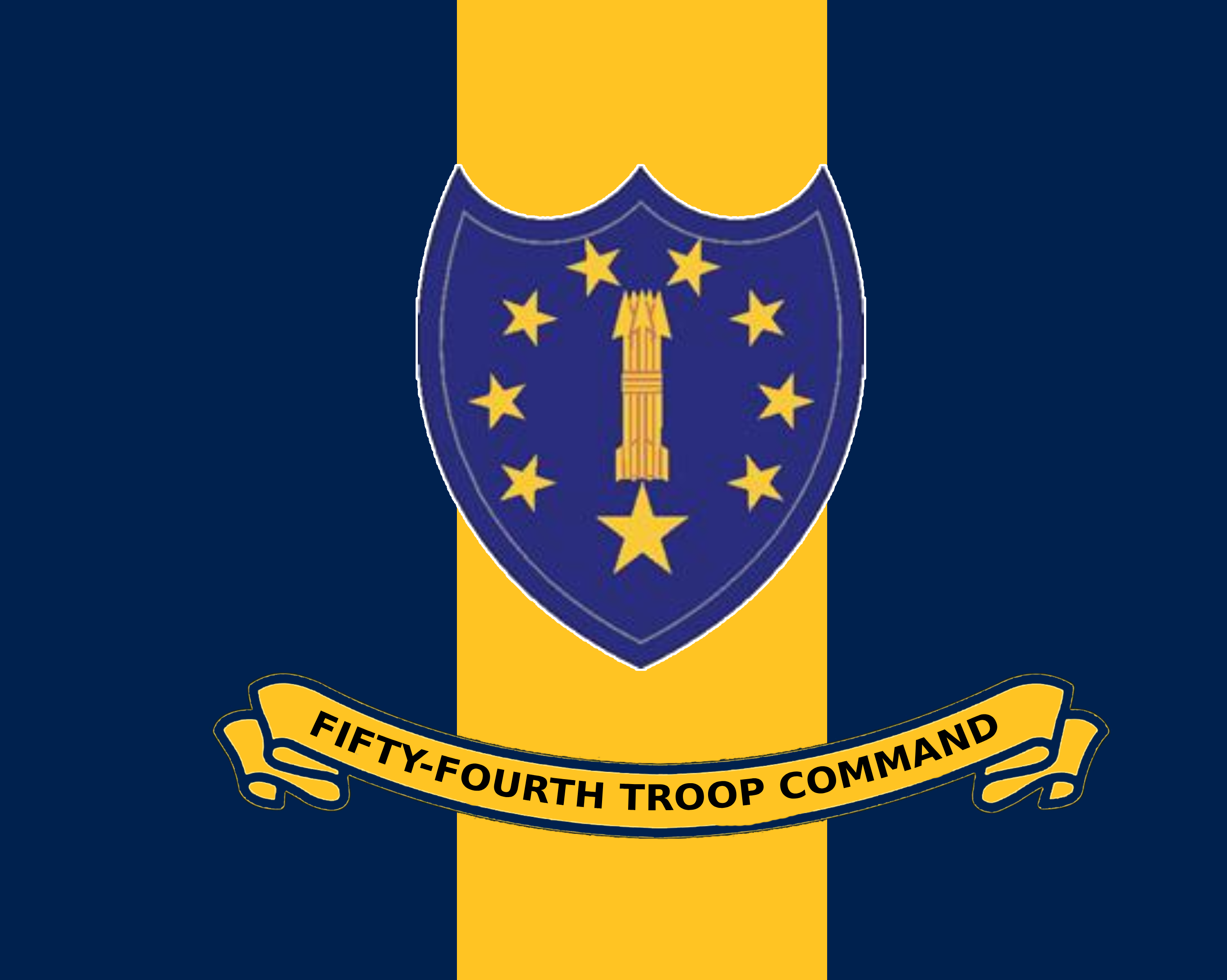
- New Hampshire Army National Guard 54th Troop Command Flag

The 54th Troop Command (New Hampshire Army National Guard) is the Headquarter and Headquarters Company of the state national guard. The command is the administrative, personnel and logistics center of the NHARNG. They also run the New Hampshire Regional Training Institute which trains both warrant officers and commissioned officers for the NHARNG. This includes teh 92Y Senior Leader's Course, Officer Candidate School, Warrant Officer Candidate School, Company Commander/First Sergeant Pre-Command Courses.

== Structure ==
54th Troop Command, Pembroke, NH

- 195th Training Regiment, Pembroke, NH
- 12th Civil Support Team, Concord, NH
- C Company 3/238th Aviation Regiment, Concord, NH
- A Company 1/169th Aviation Regiment, Concord, NH
- Detachment 18 Operational support Airlift Agency (OSAA), Concord, NH
- 237th Military Police Company, Pembroke, NH and Lebanon, NH
- 39th Army Band, Manchester, NH
- 114th Public Affairs Detachment, Concord, NH
- 603rd Public Affairs Detachment, Manchester, NH
- C Company 3/172 Infantry Regiment (Mountain)/86th IBCT Command, Milford, NH
- Detachment 1, 160th Engineer Company, Concord, NH
- 1986th Contingency Contracting Team, Concord, NH
