= Puerto Rico Army National Guard =

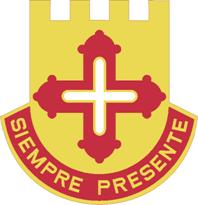
- Puerto Rico Army National Guard Headquarters DUI
- Founded: June 23, 1969; 57 years ago
- Country: United States
- Allegiance: Puerto Rico
- Branch: United States Army
- Type: Army National Guard
- Role: United States Army National Guard; Provide soldiers to the U.S. Army in national emergencies or when requested by the president of the United States; ground-based operations at the state level or any other lawful service as requested by the governor of Puerto Rico
- Size: 7,500
- Part of: Puerto Rico National Guard
- Garrison/HQ: San Juan, Puerto Rico

Commanders
- Adjutant General for Puerto Rico: Brigade General (PR) Carlos J. Rivera-Roman

Insignia
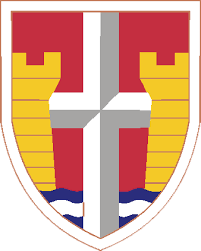
- Puerto Rico Army National Guard SSI

- Puerto Rico Army National Guard Crest

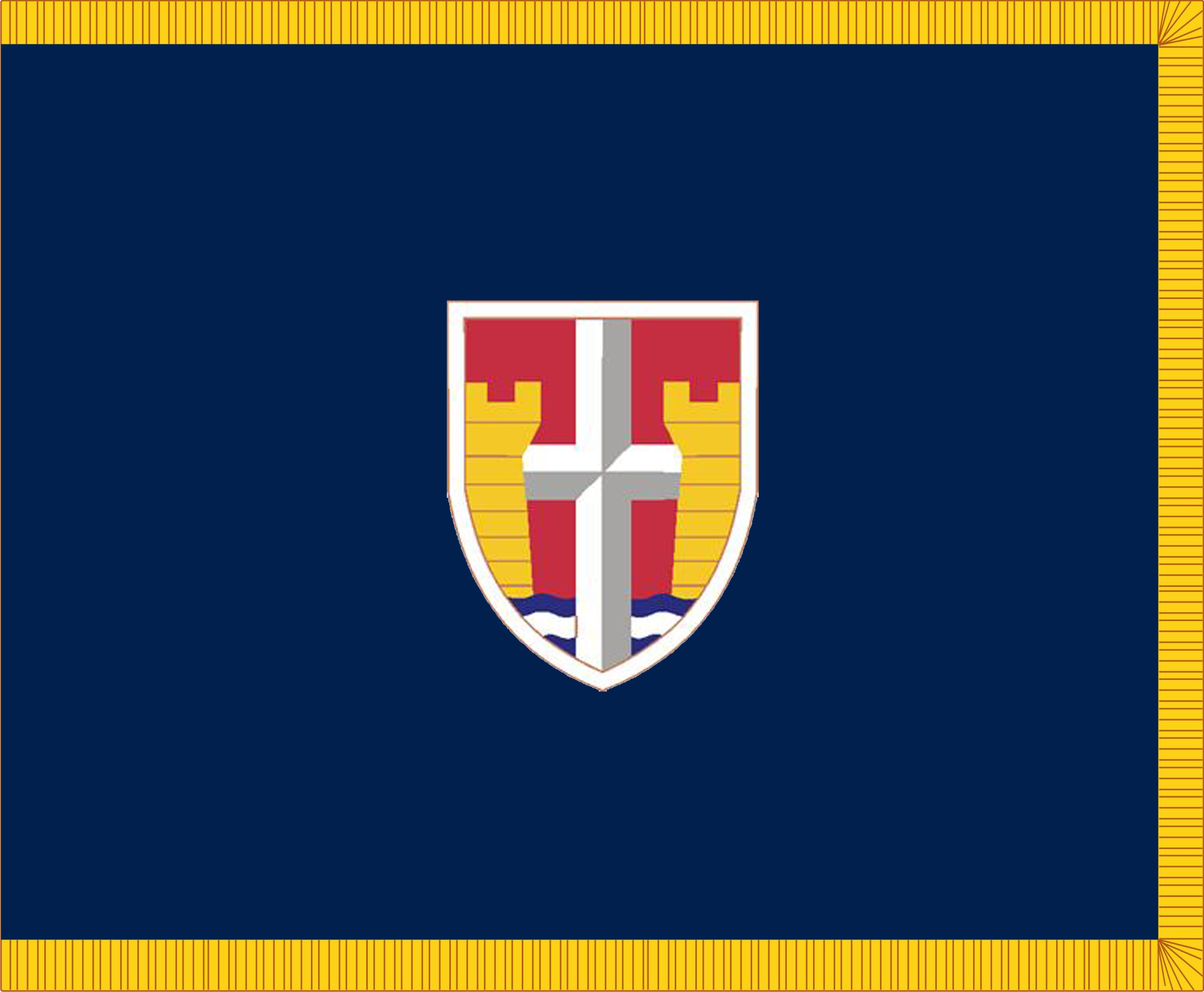
- Puerto Rico Army National Guard Headquarters Flag

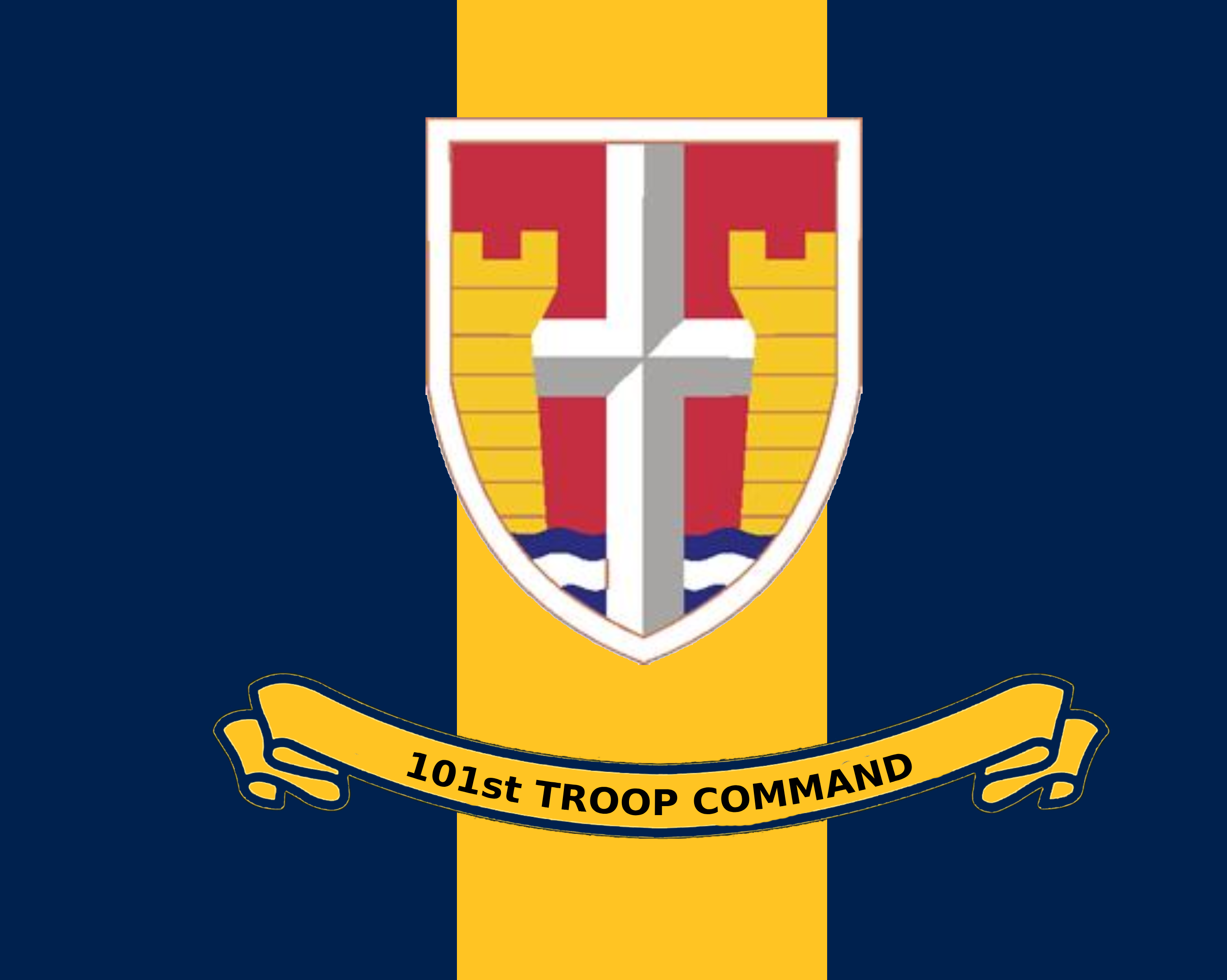
- Puerto Rico Army National Guard 101st Troop Command Flag

The Puerto Rico Army National Guard (PRARNG) — officially designated in Spanish as Guardia Nacional Terrestre de Puerto Rico, but colloquially known as Ejército de la Guardia Nacional de Puerto Rico — is the Army National Guard of the archipelago of Puerto Rico which, together with the Puerto Rico Air National Guard, comprises the Puerto Rico National Guard. PRARNG is the ground-component of the Puerto Rico National Guard under control of the governor of Puerto Rico, currently Jenniffer González-Colón, that performs missions equivalent to those of the Army National Guards of the different states of the United States, including ground defense, disaster relief, and control of civil unrest.

== History ==
The Puerto Rico National Guard, like the national guards in all 50 states, is a hybrid organization. National guards are ordinarily under the control of state (or, in the case of Puerto Rico, commonwealth) officials, but are organized pursuant to federal statute, and in war time or other emergencies, Guard units may be brought under federal control. The Puerto Rico Army National Guard and Reserve units support USARSO's many multilateral exercises and programs. It is through this integration of the Active Army, National Guard, and Reserves that US Army South [USARSO] can maximize resources to carry its missions.

In 1989, Congress authorized federal funding to permit the local National Guards to support drug interdiction and other counter-drug activities. 32 U.S.C. § 112. Section 112 provided that each state desiring to participate would draw up its own plan subject to approval by the Secretary of Defense. Despite this and other authority over the program granted to the Secretary of Defense, the statute required that the National Guard personnel involved in these operations be under local control and "not in Federal service," id. § 112(c)(1), a requirement apparently designed to mesh with the Posse Comitatus Act, 18 U.S.C. § 1385, limiting the use of federal troops for domestic law enforcement purposes.

Most National Guard members ordinarily serve only part-time, but there are exceptions. Section 112 itself provided that subject to Secretary of Defense regulations, local National Guard members could, pursuant to a state plan, "be ordered to perform full-time National Guard duty under section 502(f) of this title for the purpose of carrying out drug interdiction and counter-drug activities." 32 U.S.C. § 502(f) allows National Guard personnel to be assigned additional duties, apart from ordinary drills and field exercises, with the provision appropriate for "pay and allowances."

Beginning in 1989, the Puerto Rico National Guard used the federal funds provided under section 112 for a variety of counter-drug projects. In one of the projects, Puerto Rico National Guard personnel assisted the U.S. Customs Service in inspecting cargo containers arriving and leaving Puerto Rico ports and airports.

The Puerto Rico National Guard claims to be a direct descendant of the original militia that existed on the Island since the time of the Spanish colonization at the beginning of the 16th century. Four years after the militia establishment by Juan Ponce de León. The Puerto Rican Indians, called Tainos, rebelled in 1511. The Spanish men (mostly farmers and mine workers) had to quit their jobs to take arms and defend their adopted land. Since that unconfirmed date in 1511 when Taino Indians killed Cristobal de Sotomayor and burned the town named in his honor, the Borinquen colonists had to form, by necessity, a sort of National Guard unit with citizens as its soldiers.

The Milicias Urbanas de Puerto Rico was first organized in 1693 and reorganized in 1765 as the Milicias Disciplinadas de Puerto Rico. After the Lares Uprising of 1868, the Spanish, doubting the loyalty of Puerto Ricans, began to disband these companies, including the Compania de Artilleros Morenos de Cangrejos, a separate company of black Puerto Ricans. The milicias, are the direct lineal ancestors of two of today's Puerto Rico National Guard Units, the 295th and 296th Infantry. The milicias were replaced in 1871 by another similar organization, El Instituto de Voluntarios.

In 1899, the U.S. Congress authorized the establishment of a military unit composed of Puerto Ricans and in 1900 the Porto Rico Battalion was established. Through successive reorganizations this unit became the Porto Rico Voluntary Infantry, The Porto Rican Provisional Regiment of Infantry, the Porto Rico Regiment, U.S. Infantry and finally in 1920, the 65th Regiment, U.S. Infantry. The Puerto Rico National Guard eventually became the 296th Infantry Regiment ("Alerta Esta" - "Always Alert").

The Porto Rico Regiment, U.S. Infantry, 4,000 strong, served in World War I. From 1917 to 1919 it guarded the Panama Canal. During this period, the Porto Rico National guard also came into existence with the creation of the 295th and 296th Infantry Regiments. Additionally, several "Home Guard" units were organized and many other Puerto Ricans living in the continental U.S. served in mainland units that fought in Europe. Dark skinned Puerto Ricans were placed in such racially segregated units as the 396th Infantry, "The Harlem Hell Fighters" who fought under French command. Rafael Hernandez the famous Puerto Rican musician/composer and his brother, Jesus, served in that unit's band. All told, 236,000 Puerto Ricans registered for the World War I draft and 18,000 served in the military.

Although war plans did not call for separate infantry brigades in the United States, the War Department authorized a new 92d Infantry Brigade in the Puerto Rico National Guard to command forces there. The new headquarters came into federal service on 15 October 1940, but served less than two years without seeing combat. In July 1942 the Caribbean Defense Command inactivated the brigade and replaced it with the Puerto Rican Mobile Force

It has been estimated that anywhere from 250,000 to 500,000 Hispanics served in the armed forces during World War II. This represents a range of 2.5 to 5% of all persons who served during the war. Figures are imprecise because, with the exception of Puerto Ricans, data on Hispanics were not maintained. Over 53,000 Puerto Ricans served during the period 1940-1946. National guard units from Texas, New Mexico, Arizona, and California had a high representation of Mexican Americans. The US Army has never segregated Hispanic soldiers. The Puerto Rico National Guard was called into Federal Active Service in October 1940, and assigned to the Puerto Rican Department in accordance with the existing War Plan Orange. Members of Puerto Rico's National Guard, of the present 65th USA Reserve Command, and of its ancestors, the 65th Infantry Regiment and the 1899 Puerto Rican Regiment US Volunteers, were residents of the archipelago. Approximately 200 Puerto Rican women served in the Women's Army Corps.

Puerto Rico Army National Guard (PRARNG) support to the Puerto Rico Police Department (PRPD) is the longest sustained support to a law enforcement mission in modern U.S. history. Targets are drug dealers and other criminal elements. The Puerto Rico National Guard (PRNG) has concentrated on the Homeland Defense [HLD] mission by fighting drug-related crime on the archipelago and providing humanitarian relief to the communities affected by the drug trade. The PRNG concentrates on support to domestic civil authorities, counterdrug operations and humanitarian assistance. During Operation Centurion in 1996, PRNG units and the police moved into 76 housing projects to arrest dealers and criminals and restore community order. Puerto Rico governor Pedro Rossello created the program to reinforce limited Puerto Rico LEA assets and drive out drug traffickers from housing areas. The secondary objective was to restore normalcy to communities through a coordinated security and social effort. Soldiers from aviation and military police units supported the police in the initial cordon, search, seizure and arrest phase. Once the target area was cleared of identifiable criminal elements, infantry, artillery, engineer and maintenance personnel helped community agencies rebuild housing complexes, distribute antidrug literature, rehabilitate facilities and dispose of garbage.

The program was a resounding success, and the PRNG's skills and resources were paramount. This wealth of operational experience grew the PRNG's Stability and support operations skills considerably. They also built close cooperation, reinforced habitual relationships and integrated with police and various social agencies.

Operation FRONTIER SHIELD was introduced in fiscal year 1997 to test this concept in the maritime approaches to Puerto Rico and the Virgin Islands. This region was identified as the second largest gateway, behind the Southwest Border, for drugs entering the United States and provided an emergent opportunity to create an immediate and measurable impact. Operation FRONTIER SHIELD demonstrates the tangible positive impacts of interdiction in Puerto Rico. In 1997, drug related crime was down 37 percent from the year before and the governor no longer needed the Puerto Rico National Guard to maintain order in the housing areas. On the streets of San Juan cocaine purity went down and street prices rose nearly 36 `percent throughout 1997.

A major Jamaica Defence Force (JDF)-US bilateral training program is the quarterly unit exchange between the Puerto Rico Army National Guard and the 3rd Battalion, Jamaica Regiment (National Reserve). Under this exchange program, platoon-sized elements from each unit "trade places" for a four-day period and participate in weapons familiarization and other small unit training.

The Puerto Rico Army National Guard, America's unique bicultural force, is composed of more than 8,600 citizen-soldiers. During FY99, the PRARNG was recognized as one of the most versatile and best prepared state militias of the United States. FY99 began with troops supporting the Island's communities recovering from the devastating effects of Hurricane Georges. Soldiers were summoned to perform disaster relief operations and engineering support for road clearance and debris removal.

The PRARNG also supported communities using their specialized skills. Medical units provided preventive health care, education, and immunizations in low-income neighborhoods. Guard members served drug and law enforcement agencies through its Counter Drug Program, resulting in the confiscation of millions of dollars in illegal drugs. The PRNG is the only organization in the US conducting all three NGB-sponsored youth programs: STARBASE, Youth Conservation Corps, and Challenge. At the international level, the 113th Mobile Public Affairs Detachment deployed to Honduras, Nicaragua and El Salvador in support of Hurricane Mitch disaster relief. Aviation units provided helicopter support to Joint Task Force Esteli in Nicaragua as part of the US Southern Command Exercise New Horizons '99. The PRARNG also commenced the State Partnership Program with the Republic of Honduras.

== Organization ==
- Joint Force Headquarters-Puerto Rico, Army Element, at Fort Buchanan
  - Headquarters and Headquarters Detachment, Joint Force Headquarters-Puerto Rico, Army Element, at Fort Buchanan
  - Puerto Rico Recruiting & Retention Battalion
  - Puerto Rico Medical Detachment
  - Camp Santiago Joint Training Center, in Salinas
  - Army Aviation Support Facility #1, at Isla Grande Airport
  - Field Maintenance Shop #1
  - 22nd Civil Support Team (WMD)
  - 92nd Military Police Brigade, in Caguas
    - Headquarters and Headquarters Company, 92nd Military Police Brigade, in Caguas
    - 1st Battalion, 65th Infantry Regiment, in Cayey (part of 79th Infantry Brigade Combat Team)
      - Headquarters and Headquarters Company, 1st Battalion, 65th Infantry Regiment, in Cayey
      - Company A, 1st Battalion, 65th Infantry Regiment, in Aibonito
      - Company B, 1st Battalion, 65th Infantry Regiment, in Guayama
      - Company C, 1st Battalion, 65th Infantry Regiment, in Coamo
      - Company D (Weapons), 1st Battalion, 65th Infantry Regiment, in Cayey
      - Company I (Forward Support), 40th Brigade Support Battalion, in Cayey
    - 1st Battalion, 296th Infantry Regiment, in Mayagüez (part of 33rd Infantry Brigade Combat Team)
      - Headquarters and Headquarters Company, 1st Battalion, 296th Infantry Regiment, in Mayagüez
      - Company A, 1st Battalion, 296th Infantry Regiment, in Utuado
      - Company B, 1st Battalion, 296th Infantry Regiment, in Mayagüez
      - Company C, 1st Battalion, 296th Infantry Regiment, in Cabo Rojo
      - Company D (Weapons), 1st Battalion, 296th Infantry Regiment, in Mayagüez
      - Company I (Forward Support), 634th Brigade Support Battalion, in Mayagüez
    - 124th Military Police Battalion, at Fort Buchanan
      - Headquarters and Headquarters Detachment, 124th Military Police Battalion, at Fort Buchanan
      - 225th Military Police Company (Combat Support), at Fort Buchanan
      - 480th Military Police Company (Combat Support), at Fort Buchanan
    - 125th Military Police Battalion, in Ponce
      - Headquarters and Headquarters Detachment, 125th Military Police Battalion, in Ponce
      - 544th Military Police Company (Combat Support), in Aguadilla
      - 755th Military Police Company (Combat Support), in Arecibo
  - 101st Troop Command, at Fort Buchanan
    - Headquarters and Headquarters Company, 101st Troop Command, at Fort Buchanan
    - 113th Mobile Public Affairs Detachment, at Fort Buchanan
    - 181st Medical Company (Area Support), in Coamo
    - 192nd Quartermaster Platoon (Field Feeding), at Fort Buchanan
    - 248th Army Band, at Fort Buchanan
    - 1065th Medical Company (Area Support)
    - 1450th Judge Advocate General Trial Defense Team, at Fort Buchanan
    - 130th Engineer Battalion, in Vega Baja
      - Headquarters and Headquarters Company, 130th Engineer Battalion, in Vega Baja
      - Forward Support Company, 130th Engineer Battalion, in Vega Baja
      - 215th Engineer Detachment (Fire Fighting Team — Fire Truck)
      - 1010th Engineer Company (Engineer Construction Company)
      - 1011th Engineer Company (Vertical Construction Company)
      - 1014th Engineer Company (Sapper)
    - 190th Engineer Battalion, in Caguas
      - Headquarters and Headquarters Company, 190th Engineer Battalion, in Caguas
      - Forward Support Company, 190th Engineer Battalion, in Caguas
      - 215th Engineer Company (Vertical Construction Company), in Humacao
      - 482nd Chemical Company, at Fort Allen
      - 892nd Engineer Company (Multirole Bridge), in Juncos
      - 1015th Engineer Company (Engineer Construction Company), in Ceiba
      - 1600th Ordnance Company (EOD), in Salinas
    - Army Aviation, at Isla Grande Airport
      - Company D (MEDEVAC), 1st Battalion (Security & Support), 114th Aviation Regiment, at Isla Grande Airport (UH-72A Lakota)
      - Detachment 1, Company B, 1st Battalion (Security & Support), 114th Aviation Regiment, at Isla Grande Airport (UH-72A Lakota)
      - Detachment 1, Company A (CAC), 1st Battalion (General Support Aviation), 169th Aviation Regiment, at Isla Grande Airport, at Isla Grande Airport (UH-60L Black Hawk)
      - Detachment 2, Company G (MEDEVAC), 2nd Battalion (General Support Aviation), 238th Aviation Regiment, at Isla Grande Airport (HH-60M Black Hawk)
      - Detachment 7, Company C, 2nd Battalion (Fixed Wing), 641st Aviation Regiment (Detachment 56, Operational Support Airlift Activity), at Isla Grande Airport (C-12 Huron)
      - Detachment 1, Company B (AVIM), 777th Aviation Support Battalion, at Isla Grande Airport
  - 191st Regional Support Group, at Fort Allen
    - Headquarters and Headquarters Company, 191st Regional Support Group, at Fort Allen
    - 1930th Support Detachment (Contracting Team)
    - 292nd Combat Sustainment Support Battalion
      - Headquarters and Headquarters Company, 292nd Combat Sustainment Support Battalion
      - 219th Quartermaster Detachment (Tactical Water Distribution Team) (Hoseline)
      - 714th Quartermaster Company (Water Purification and Distribution)
      - 755th Transportation Company (Medium Truck) (Cargo)
      - 770th Transportation Company (Light-Medium Truck), at Camp Santiago Joint Training Center
      - 840th Ordnance Company (Classification and Inspection Company), at Fort Allen
    - 3678th Combat Sustainment Support Battalion
      - Headquarters and Headquarters Company, 3678th Combat Sustainment Support Battalion
      - 105th Quartermaster Company (Water Purification and Distribution)
      - 162nd Quartermaster Company (Water Purification and Distribution)
      - 783rd Ordnance Company (Support Maintenance)
      - 1243rd Transportation Company (Light-Medium Truck)
      - 1473rd Quartermaster Company (Supply)
  - 201st Multi-Functional Training Regiment, at Fort Allen

Aviation unit abbreviations: CAC — Command Aviation Company; MEDEVAC — Medical evacuation; AVIM — Aviation Intermediate Maintenance
