= 101st Troop Command =

Troop command of the Puerto Rico Army National Guard

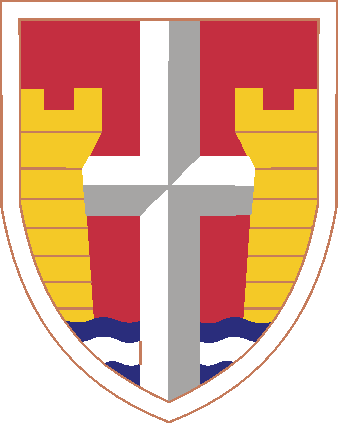
- Active: 1964 – present
- Country: United States of America
- Branch: Army National Guard
- Type: Troop Command
- Size: Brigade
- Part of: Puerto Rico Army National Guard
- Garrison/HQ: Fort Buchanan

Commanders
- Current commander: Lt. Col. Omayra Ramirez-Rosario

The 101st Troop Command (101st TC) is a troop command of the Puerto Rico Army National Guard. The command provides command and control headquarters, and logistical and administrative support to other units of the Puerto Rico Army National Guard that are not structured under another formation headquarters. It also provides administrative support to units from other formations within Puerto Rico that are stationed a long way from their respective higher headquarters. Because of this, the command's units, formation, and structure tends to be inconsistent as it changes periodically from time to time as the National Guard or the United States Army needs.

During World War II and on up to the time of the Korean War, the US Army was racially segregated. The 295th, 296th, and 65th Infantry regiments were all formations consisting mostly of Puerto Rican enlisted men and National Guardsmen.

== Organization ==
- 101st Troop Command, at Fort Buchanan
  - Headquarters and Headquarters Company, 101st Troop Command, at Fort Buchanan
  - 113th Mobile Public Affairs Detachment, at Fort Buchanan
  - 181st Medical Company (Area Support), in Coamo
  - 192nd Quartermaster Detachment (Field Feeding Team), at Fort Buchanan
  - 248th Army Band, at Fort Buchanan
  - 1065th Medical Company (Area Support)
  - 1450th Judge Advocate Trial Defense Team, at Fort Buchanan
  - 130th Engineer Battalion, in Vega Baja
    - Headquarters and Headquarters Company, 130th Engineer Battalion, in Vega Baja
    - Forward Support Company, 130th Engineer Battalion, in Vega Baja
    - 215th Engineer Detachment (Fire Fighting Team — Fire Truck)
    - 1010th Engineer Company (Engineer Construction Company)
    - 1011th Engineer Company (Vertical Construction Company)
    - 1014th Engineer Company (Sapper)
  - 190th Engineer Battalion, in Gurabo
    - Headquarters and Headquarters Company, 190th Engineer Battalion, in Gurabo
    - Forward Support Company, 190th Engineer Battalion, in Caguas
    - 215th Engineer Company (Vertical Construction Company), in Humacao
    - 482nd Chemical Company, at Fort Allen
    - 892nd Engineer Company (Multirole Bridge), in Juncos
    - 1015th Engineer Company (Engineer Construction Company), in Ceiba
    - 1600th Ordnance Company (EOD), in Salinas
  - Army Aviation, at Isla Grande Airport
    - Detachment 1, Company B, 1st Battalion (Security & Support), 114th Aviation Regiment (UH-72A Lakota)
    - Company D (Air Ambulance), 1st Battalion (Security & Support), 114th Aviation Regiment (UH-72A Lakota)
    - Company G (MEDEVAC), 2nd Battalion (General Support Aviation), 238th Aviation Regiment (HH-60M Black Hawk)
    - Detachment 7, Company C, 2nd Battalion (Fixed Wing), 641st Aviation Regiment (Detachment 56, Operational Support Airlift Activity) (C-12 Huron)
    - Detachment 1, Company B (Aviation Intermediate Maintenance), 777th Aviation Support Battalion
