= Linda Garcia Cubero =

US Air Force officer

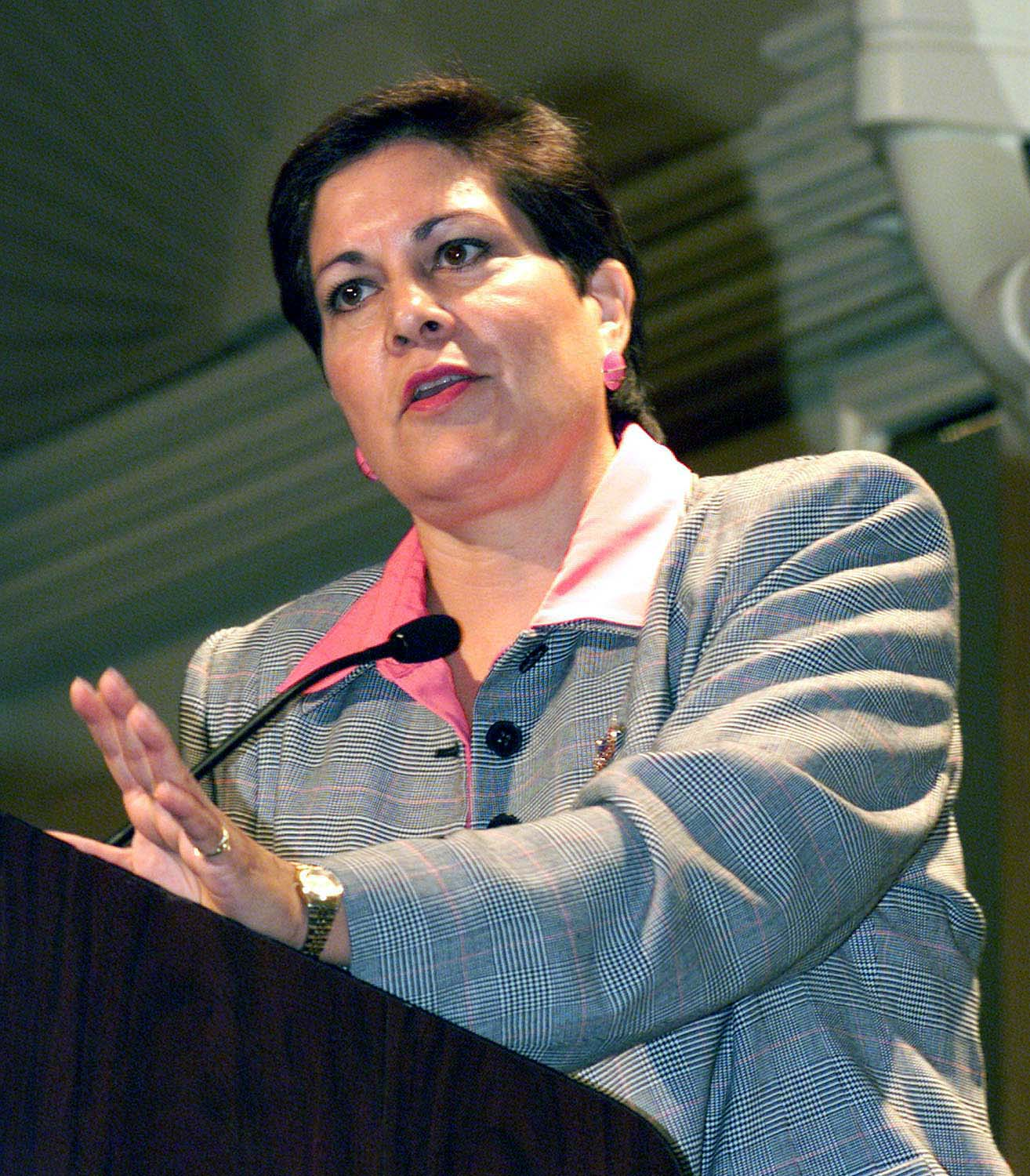
- Captain Linda Garcia Cubero; First Hispanic woman to graduate from any service academy
- Born: 1958 (age 67–68); Shreveport, Louisiana, U.S.
- Military career
- Allegiance: United States Air Force
- Service years: 1980–1987
- Rank: Captain
- Awards: Joint Service Commendation Medal
- Other work: Director of Electronics Data Systems Corporation

Captain Linda Garcia Cubero (born 1958) is a former United States Air Force officer, of Mexican-American-Puerto Rican descent who in 1980 was a member of the first class of women to graduate from the United States Air Force Academy. She is the first Hispanic woman to graduate from any service academy.

== Early years ==
Cubero's father was a United States Air Force officer of Mexican-American descent and her mother of Puerto Rican ancestry. Her father was a very influential factor in her life and she decided to follow in his footsteps and apply for admission to the United States Air Force Academy. Despite the fact that she ranked 25/485 students in her high school class and that she was a member of the National Honor Society, her guidance counselors told her that she “wasn’t good enough” to make it into the USAFA.

== United States Air Force Academy ==
The United States Air Force Academy, located immediately north of Colorado Springs in El Paso County, Colorado, United States, is an institution for the undergraduate education of officers for the United States Air Force. Graduates of the four-year program receive a Bachelor of Science degree and most are commissioned as second lieutenants in the United States Air Force.

On October 7, 1975, President Gerald R. Ford signed legislation permitting women to enter the United States service academies. On June 26, 1976, Cubero was among 157 women to enter the Air Force Academy with the Class of 1980. In 1980, Cubero made history when she became a member of the first class of women to graduate from the United States Air Force Academy. There she earned her BS degree in Political Science and her free-fall parachute wings. Upon her graduation she was commissioned a Second Lieutenant.

== Military service ==
Cubero spent the next seven years in the Air Force serving as a command briefer, and on national-level task forces at The Pentagon. In 1982, Cubero was the recipient of a Joint Service Commendation Medal for her work with the Pentagon's intelligence task force assigned to the Falkland Island conflict. While serving as Special Assistant to the Deputy Secretary of Defense, Cubero supervised the development of a United States commemorative stamp designed by Hispanic Congressional Medal of Honor recipients to honor Hispanics in America's defense. The stamp was designed by the ten surviving Hispanic Congressional Medal of Honor recipients and unveiled on October 31, 1984. She continued to further her academic education and earned a master's degree in Systems Engineering from Virginia Tech.

Cubero also served as mentor to Hispanic Air Force cadets and was a volunteer worker in the wider Hispanic community. For her community service she was awarded the 1991 Hispanic Engineer National Achievement Pioneer Award.

== Military decorations ==
Among Garcia Cuberos military decorations are the following:

- Joint Service Commendation Medal
- National Defense Medal
- Air Force Training Ribbon
- Air Force Longevity Service Award

Badges:

- Parachutist Badge
- Office of the Joint Chiefs of Staff Identification Badge

== Civilian life ==
Cubero was honorably discharged from the Air Force with the rank of Captain in 1987. She went to work for General Electric Aerospace and by 1991 was working as the company's senior systems engineer. Subsequent to GE she worked as Director of Client Relations at Case Corporation in the purchasing group.

Cubero then went to work for the Global Purchasing support unit for EDS as the director of software purchasing, directing more than $500 million annually in spending and managing 60 software and technology professionals in four departments. In April 1999, Cubero was named Director of Hardware and Telecommunications Procurement, Global Purchasing support unit of EDS, responsible for managing about $3 billion in annual hardware and software spending. From 2004 to 2007 she was Client Director at Hewlett-Packard Managed Services and is now President of Falcon Cash Investments LLC.

== Honors and recognitions ==
Cubero was awarded the Women of Color Technology Award in 1998. In 1998, Cubero was also inducted into the National Hispanic Engineering Hall of Fame. In 2002, Hispanic Business magazine named her one of the “100 Most Influential Hispanics” in the United States.

== See also ==
- List of Puerto Ricans
- List of Puerto Rican military personnel
- Puerto Rican women in the military
- Hispanics in the United States Air Force
