= Ruben A. Cubero =

United States general

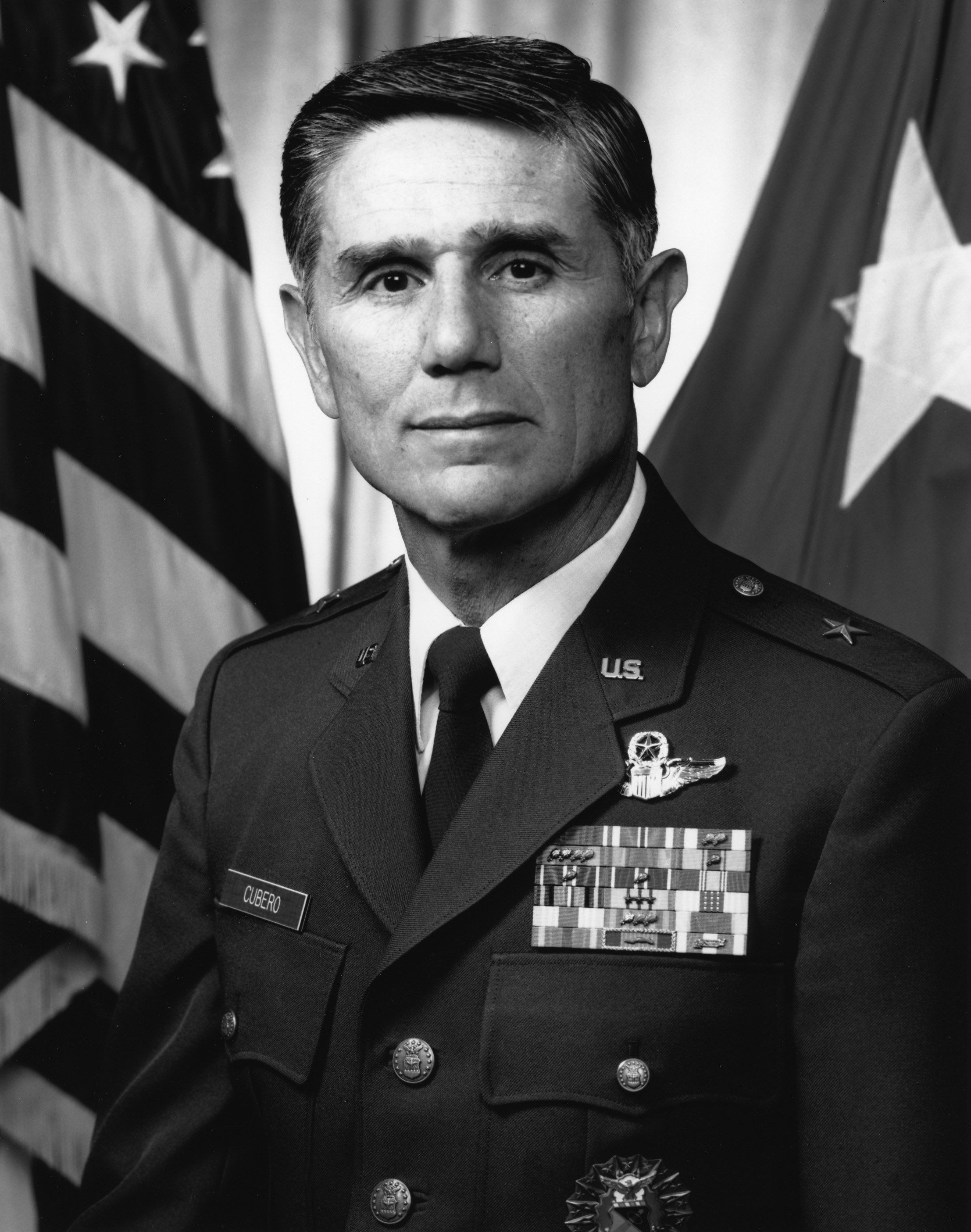
- Born: December 17, 1939 (age 86); New York City, New York
- Military career
- Allegiance: United States of America
- Branch: United States Air Force
- Service years: 1961–1998
- Rank: Brigadier general
- Commands: Dean of the faculty United States Air Force Academy
- Conflicts: Vietnam War
- Awards: Legion of Merit; Distinguished Flying Cross; Meritorious Service Medal with two oak leaf clusters Air Medal with 13 oak leaf clusters

Ruben A. Cubero (born December 17, 1939) is a retired brigadier general of the United States Air Force who became the first Hispanic graduate of the United States Air Force Academy to be named dean of the faculty of the Air Force Academy.

== Early years ==
During the 1930s, Puerto Rico's economic situation suffered because of the Great Depression and many of the islanders moved to the northeastern coast of the United States in search of jobs. Cubero's parents, who were from the towns of Isabela and Camuy, were among the many Puerto Ricans who moved to New York City seeking a better life. Cubero's parents settled down in the Bronx borough of the city where he was born. Cubero went to school in the city's public school system receiving his primary education at P.S. (public school). His family moved to Queens, New York, when he was a teenager and he continued his education at Xavier High School, a Jesuit institution in Manhattan. He was a lieutenant colonel in the Jr ROTC unit and was an All-City guard on the football team despite his light weight. Cubero graduated from high school in 1957.

== Military career ==
Cubero entered the United States Air Force in 1957 and was accepted into the Air Force Academy. During his time at the Academy, he was a starting guard on the football team and won many honors. He was the lightest starting lineman in major college football at the time. On June 7, 1961, Cubero graduated from the third graduating class of the Academy with a Bachelor of Science degree and a commission as a second lieutenant.

From August 1961 to February 1963, he served as a pilot trainee in both the 3526th Student Squadron, Williams Air Force Base in Arizona and Tinker Air Force Base, Oklahoma. He was promoted to the rank of First Lieutenant on December 7, 1962. After he earned his pilot wings, Cubero was assigned to McGuire Air Force Base in New Jersey in February 1963. There he flew the C-118 and the C-135. On December 7, 1965, he was promoted to the rank of captain and in June 1966 he was reassigned to the 76th Military Airlift Squadron, Charleston Air Force Base, South Carolina, where he piloted a C-141.<

=== Vietnam War ===
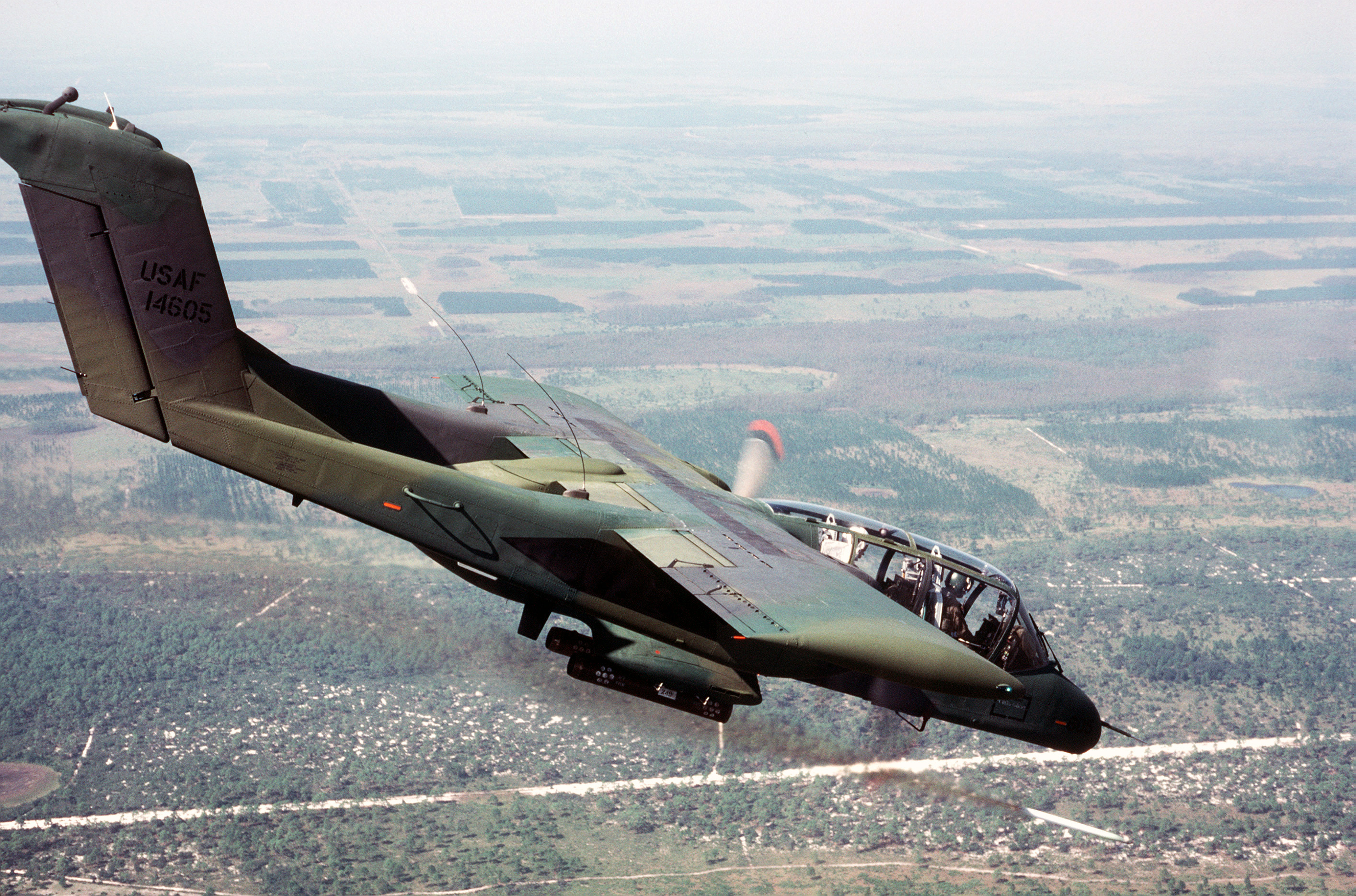
OV-10 - Type of aircraft flown by Cubero

Cubero was sent to the Republic of Vietnam in May 1969 and was assigned to the 19th Tactical Air Support Squadron, Tay Ninh West where he flew an OV-10 and served as a forward air controller supporting the 1st Brigade, 25th Infantry Division. In November 1969, he was reassigned to the 19th Tactical Air Support Squadron (standards and evaluation), at Bien Hoa Air Base.

== Post Vietnam ==
In 1970, after serving in Vietnam, Cubero returned to the States and attended the University of New Mexico. He was promoted to major on November 1, 1971, and in 1972, he earned his master's degree in Latin American studies. After he graduated, he was named chairman of Spanish, Department of Foreign Languages of the U.S. Air Force Academy, a position in which he served until January 1975.

From December 1975 to February 1978, Cubero served as instructor, director of joint operations at the School of the Americas and later as senior Air Force representative at Fort Gulick in Panama. During his stay in Panama, Cubero took the Army Command and General Staff Course. He was promoted to the rank of lieutenant colonel on August 1, 1977. Cubero was named faculty instructor at Air University in Maxwell Air Force Base in Alabama in 1978. After four months, he returned to the Air Force Academy as acting department head, Department of Foreign Languages. In January 1980, he became a professor and the acting department head of the Department of Foreign Languages.

In June 1981, Cubero pursued his doctoral degree in higher education and administration at the University of Denver in Colorado. On January 1, 1982, Cubero was promoted to the rank of colonel, and in 1983 he obtained his doctorate.

From December 1982 to July 1991, Cubero served in various positions at the Air Force Academy. Among these were assistant to the dean of the faculty, professor and head of the Department of Foreign Languages and permanent professor and head of the Department of Foreign Languages.

In July 1991, Cubero was named dean of the faculty, becoming the first person of Hispanic heritage in that position. As dean of the faculty, Cubero commanded the 865-member dean of the faculty mission element and oversaw the annual design and instruction of more than 500 undergraduate courses to 4,000 cadets in 19 academic departments. He led and supervised four support staff agencies and directed the operation of faculty resources involving more than $250 million. Cubero established the Air Force Academy's first cooperative research and development agreement. On August 3, 1991, Cubero was promoted to the rank of brigadier general. Cubero retired from the Air Force on July 1, 1998. He had more than 6,000 flight hours.

== Currently ==
Cubero is the president of the Falcon Foundation, an organization which awards scholarships to minority members to the Air Force Academy. Cubero currently resides in Colorado Springs, Colorado, with his wife of 45 years, Janet Cubero. The Cuberos participate in and make donations to many charities. Among them, The Casa of the Pikes Peak Region, whose goal is to ensure safety and permanency for children whose lives are in turmoil.

== Awards and recognition ==
Among Cubero's decorations and medals were the following:

- Legion of Merit
- Distinguished Flying Cross,
- Meritorious Service Medal with two oak leaf clusters,
- Air Medal with 13 oak leaf clusters,
- Air Force Commendation Medal with oak leaf cluster,
- Air Force Outstanding Unit Award with oak leaf cluster,
- National Defense Service Medal with bronze service star,
- Armed Forces Expeditionary Medal with bronze service star,
- Vietnam Service Medal with bronze service star
- Vietnam Campaign Medal
- Vietnam Cross of Gallantry with Palm Streamer

Badges:

- Command pilot
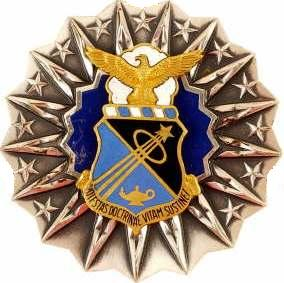
- Air Force Academy Professor Badge

== See also ==
- List of Puerto Ricans
- List of Puerto Rican military personnel
- Hispanics in the United States Air Force
