= Noel Zamot =

Colonel in the US Air Force (born 1965)

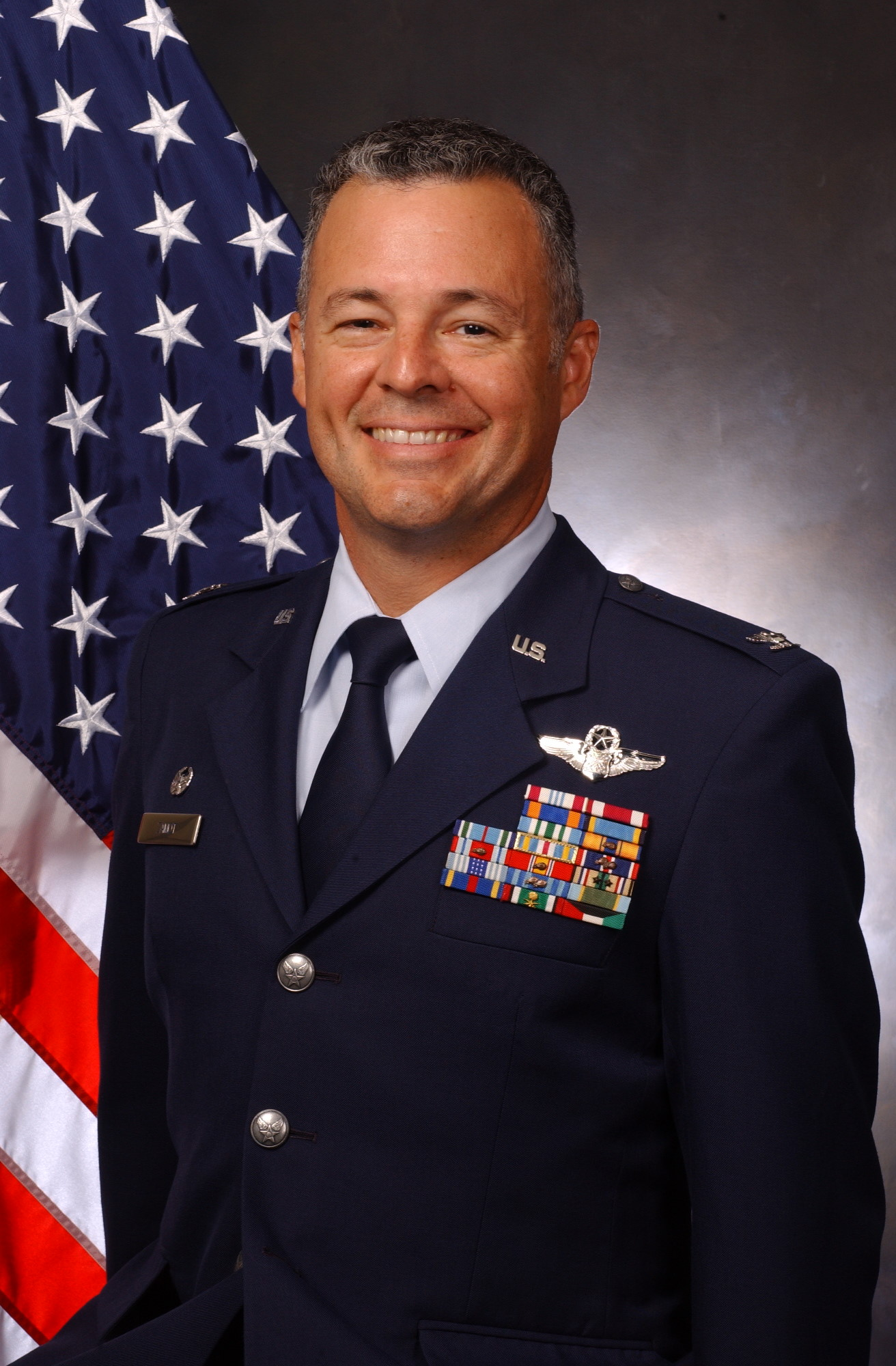
- Col. Noel Zamot; First Hispanic Commandant of the Air Force's elite Test Pilot School
- Born: Noel Zamot Cordero; December 21, 1965 (age 60); Rio Piedras, Puerto Rico
- Alma mater: University of Michigan
- Military career
- Allegiance: United States of America
- Branch: United States Air Force
- Service years: 1987-2012
- Rank: Colonel
- Commands: 1.97th Mission Support Group, Altus Air Force Base, Oklahoma (2008 – 2010). 2.United States Air Force Flight Test Center, Test Pilot School, Edwards Air Force Base, California (2010 – 2012).
- Conflicts: Gulf War
- Other work: 1.Founder of Corvus Analytics; 2.Revitalization Coordinator for the Oversight Board in Puerto Rico

Colonel Noel Zamot (born December 21, 1965) is a retired United States Air Force officer who was the first Hispanic Commandant of the Air Force's elite Test Pilot School. Zamot is a former combat and test aviator with over 1900 hours in B-52, B-1B, B-2A, F-16D and over 20 other aircraft. He created the first system for testing complex military systems in contested cyberspace for the United States. Zamot is also the founder of Corvus Analytics, a consulting firm which helps its clients to design and develop cyber resiliency for complex systems.

== Early years ==
Zamot (birth name: Noel Zamot Cordero) was born and raised in Rio Piedras, Puerto Rico. He was accepted in the Massachusetts Institute of Technology after he completed his primary education and graduated from high school. He earned his Bachelor of Science in Engineering Degree from MIT in 1986. In 1987, he earn a Master of Science in Aerospace Engineering Degree from the University of Michigan at Ann Arbor, Michigan.

== Military career ==
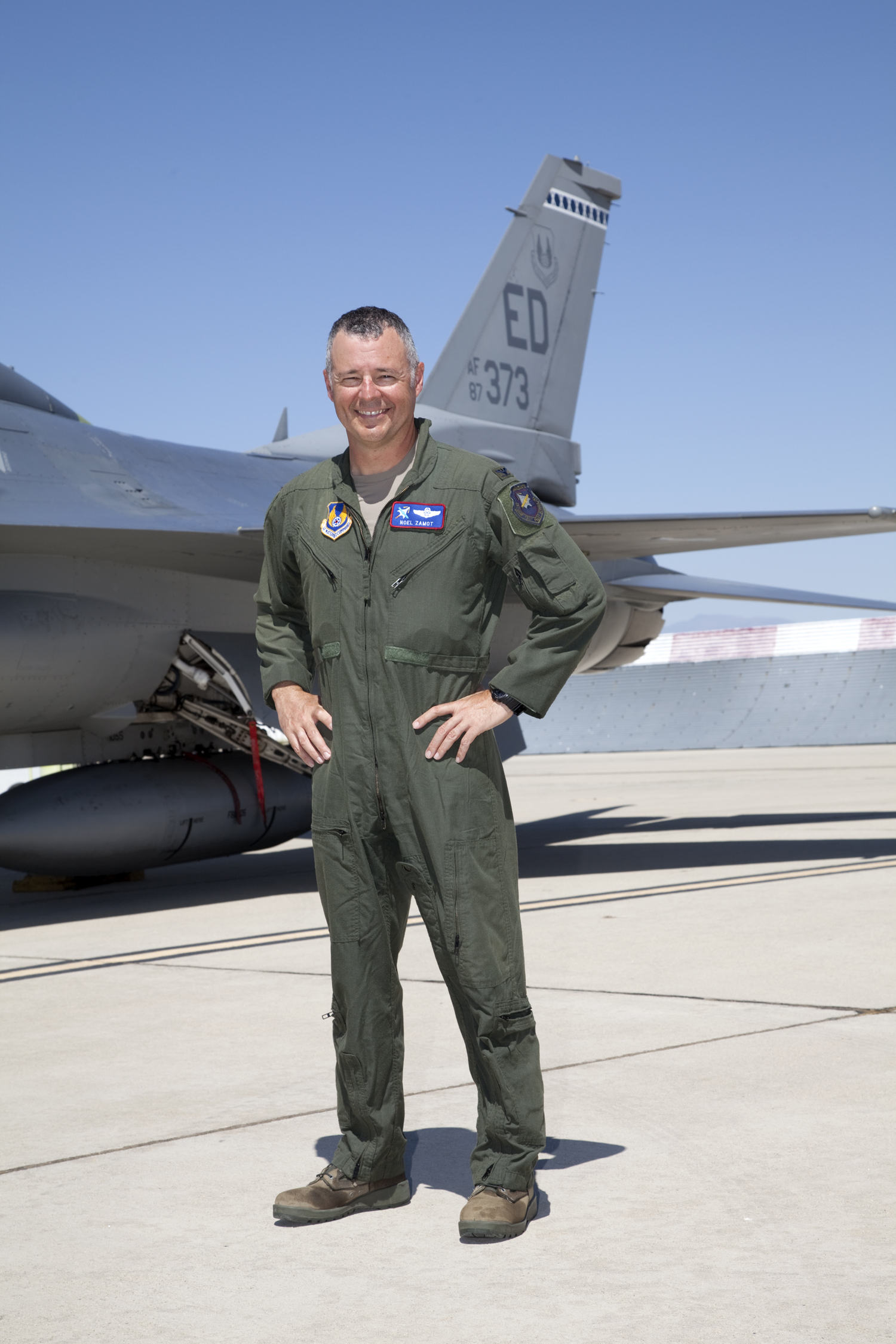
Colonel Noel Zamot

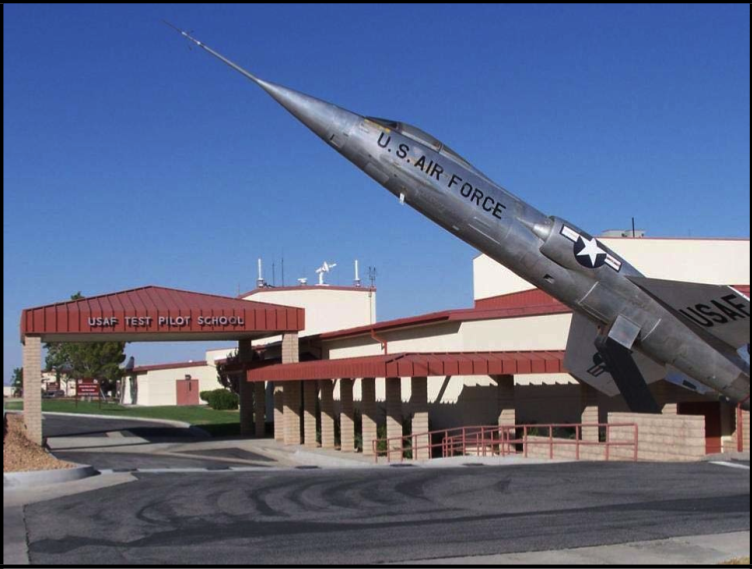
USAF Test Pilot School, Edwards AFB, California

He joined the United States Air Force in 1987, after graduating from the University of Michigan and became a commissioned officer with the rank of second lieutenant. In 1999, he completed a course called "Programa Avanzado de Administracion de Empresas" (Advanced Business Management Program), of the "Escuela de Administracion de Negocios para Graduados" (Graduate School of Business Administration) in Lima, Peru. That same year he graduated from the Air Command and Staff College. His experience as a pilot include more than 2,000 flight hours. Included among his flight hours are over 200 combat hours and combat support hours. He has flown the B-52G, B-1B, B-2A, F-15, F-16, AT-38 and MiG-15.

In 2001, he was assigned to the Directorate of Operations, United States Space Command, Paterson Air Force Base in Colorado as Deputy Chief of Operations Integration. According to the United States Air Force, Zamot's mission as Deputy Chief of Operations in the aftermath of the September 11 attacks was to integrate emerging national capabilities into a joint counter terrorism operation. He developed concepts for long-term Information Operations and Space Control activities for the US enabling a multi-spectral combat response. He was also involved in the development of the Special Access Program (SAP) systems and in the development of new counter-space capabilities which resulted in a more effective counter-terrorism operation across 3 combat zones.

In 2006, he served as the Chief of the training and exercises division of the North Atlantic Treaty Organization (NATO) Combined Land Headquarters in Madrid, Spain. As such, he represented the United States as the Senior National Representative. He was responsible for overseeing the conduct, execution and status of the US forces. He also trained the multinational NATO headquarters for a global contingency response. That same year he was selected as a member of the NASA Astronaut Training Group 16 and became a semi finalist NASA astronaut candidate. He also earned his Master of Science in National Security Strategy from the National War College.

In 2008, Zamot was named Commander of the 97th Mission Support Group of the 97th Air Mobility Wing, in the USAF's largest mobility training base, located in Altus Air Force Base, Oklahoma. He was responsible for the support of over 3000 military and civilian personnel. He also had to provide infrastructure management, construction support for installation hosting over 35 USAF aircraft. Zamot was awarded two important recognitions; one for having the most effective installation infrastructure project management team for 2009 and the other for the most effective IT organization based on national cyber incident response.

Zamot was named Commander of the United States Air Force's elite Test Pilot School in 2010, located in Edwards Air Force Base, California. Among his duties was to provide program management to eight flight research programs, liaising with international partners, and providing academic oversight for a Master's level engineering program. He created nation's first system for testing complex military systems in contested cyberspace. Other achievements during his tenure include:

- 2011—First Remotely Piloted Aircraft (RPA) test pilot
- 2012—Flight test course for enlisted personnel
- 2012—Cyber Systems Test Course introduced

Zamot retired from the United States Air Force in 2012, after 25 years of military service.

== Corvus Analytics ==
After his retirement from the Air Force, he established and served as Senior Manager of Mission Systems Sector. The Mission Systems Sector provided program management and other services to the US Air Force, US Navy, US Coast Guard and Federal government. He also worked in the Acquisition Management Division of Wyle Aerospace Group, a multi-state Business Unit providing cyber-security to customers in the Department of Defense & Federal Government.

In 2015, Zamot founded the Corvus Analytics in Bedford, Massachusetts. Among the services which the firm provides its clientele is the designing and development of cyber resiliency for complex systems.

=== PREPA ===
The Puerto Rico Electric Power Authority, a.k.a. "PREPA" was founded in 1941 and is the sole provider of electricity for 1.5 million customers. The maintenance of the electrical system's infrastructure by the power authority, had been abandoned over the past decades. The impact of Hurricane Maria basically completed the destruction of the islands power grid leaving thousands of Puerto Rican households without electricity. Whitefish Energy, a two-person operation, was given a $300 million, no-bid contract to restore the power grid in Puerto Rico. The Montana company's lack of experience with projects that big and its alleged ties to President Trump's administration were questioned and the contract was canceled.

In 2017, Zamot was appointed and approved by Puerto Rico's Governor Ricardo Rosselló to serve as the Revitalization Coordinator for the Oversight Board, replacing Aaron Bielenberg. The oversight board was created under the 2016 Puerto Rico rescue law known as "PROMESA". Zamot made the following statement upon his appointment:

"I feel honored to serve and give back to Puerto Rico, my birthplace, and contribute to its success,” “I look forward to working with government and the private sector to establish the conditions for future growth and to increase investment in our island,”

The Oversight Board nominated Zamot for the position of emergency manager. However, the governor of Puerto Rico, opposed the nomination before the U.S. Federal Court because he believed that the move was an overreach of the oversight board's authority. The U.S. District Judge Laura Taylor Swain ruled against the installment of Zamot in said position.

== Writing ==
Zamot published a novel, "The Archer's Thread," in September 2021. According to his website, the protagonist is a man who can see ten seconds into the future. In an online interview, Zamot stated he drew on professional experience for portions of the book, and indicated he is working on a sequel.

== Personal life ==
Noel Zamot resides in Florida and is married to Diane Irene Zamot. They have two children, Noel Sebastian Zamot, a 2nd lieutenant in the United States Air Force, who Studied Systems Engineering at the United States Air Force Academy and Cameron Gabriel Zamot. He is on the Board of Directors of the International Test and Evaluation Association (ITEA), a member of the Society of Flight Test Engineers and the Association of Old Crows.

== Awards and decorations ==

US Air Force Command Pilot Badge
Defense Meritorious Service Medal	Meritorious Service Medal	Air Medal
Aerial Achievement Medal	Joint Service Commendation Medal	Air Force Commendation Medal w/ 1 bronze oak leaf cluster
Joint Service Achievement Medal	Joint Meritorious Unit Award	Air Force Outstanding Unit Award w/ 2 bronze oak leaf cluster
Combat Readiness Medal w/ 1 bronze oak leaf clusters	National Defense Service Medal w/ 1 bronze oak leaf cluster	Southwest Asia Service Medal; W/ 2 service stars
Air Force Overseas Short Tour Service Ribbon	Air Force Longevity Service Award w/ 2 bronze oak leaf cluster	Small Arms Expert Marksmanship Ribbon
Air Force Training Ribbon	Kuwait Liberation Medal (Saudi Arabia)	Kuwait Liberation Medal (Kuwait)

== See also ==
- List of Puerto Ricans
- List of Puerto Rican military personnel
- Hispanics in the United States Air Force
- Military history of Puerto Rico
