= Salvador E. Felices =

First Puerto Rican to reach the rank of major general in the United States Air Force

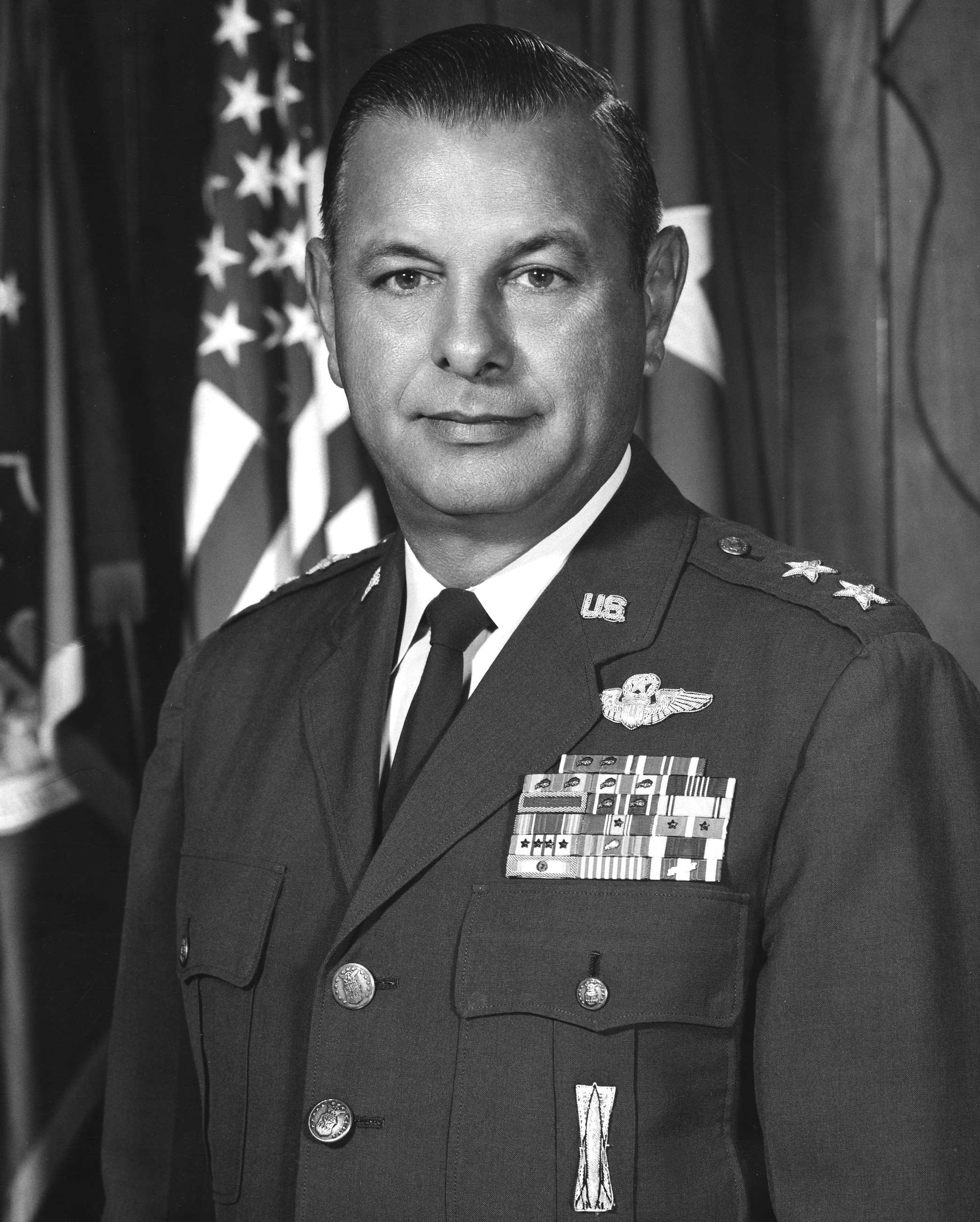
- Major General Salvador E. Felices; Participated in the first around the world flight by an all-jet aircraft.
- Born: August 13, 1923; Santurce, Puerto Rico
- Died: July 14, 1987 (aged 63); Vienna, Austria
- Burial place: United States Air Force Academy Cemetery
- Military career
- Allegiance: United States of America
- Branch: United States Air Force
- Service years: 1946–1974
- Rank: Major General
- Nickname: Cucho
- Unit: Headquarters SAC
- Commands: 306th Bombardment Wing; 416th Bombardment Wing; Sixteenth Air Force
- Conflicts: Korean War; Vietnam War
- Awards: Air Force Distinguished Service Medal; Legion of Merit w/ two oak leaf clusters Distinguished Flying Cross; Air Medal w/ two oak leaf clusters Air Force Commendation Medal w/ two oak leaf clusters Army Commendation Medal

Major General Salvador Enrique Felices (August 13, 1923 – July 14, 1987) was the first Puerto Rican to reach the rank of major general in the United States Air Force. In 1957, he participated in "Operation Power Flite", the first round-the-world nonstop flight by a jet airplane.

== Early years ==
Felices was born in the Santurce section of San Juan, Puerto Rico the capital city of island. There he received his primary and secondary education. After graduating from the Santurce Central High School, he enrolled in the University of Puerto Rico and joined its Air Force ROTC program.

== West Point ==
In 1943, Felices was granted a congressional appointment to West Point, the U.S. Military Academy in New York. While he was a cadet at the academy, he undertook flying lessons at Curtis Field, Texas and Stewart Field in New York. On June 4, 1946, he was awarded his pilot wings and the following day he graduated from the academy and was commissioned as a second lieutenant.

== Military service ==
On September 18, 1947, he became part of the newly formed branch of the armed forces, the United States Air Force. Felices received training in multi-engines and also completed the weapons training course. He was assigned in 1952, to the 303rd Bombardment Wing as the 359th Bombardment Squadron operations officer. Felices participated in a bombing competition, using a B-29 Superfortress equipped with an APQ-7 radar set and a Norden bombsight rate head. This eventually led to the development of the current techniques of synchronous radar bombing.

== Korean War ==
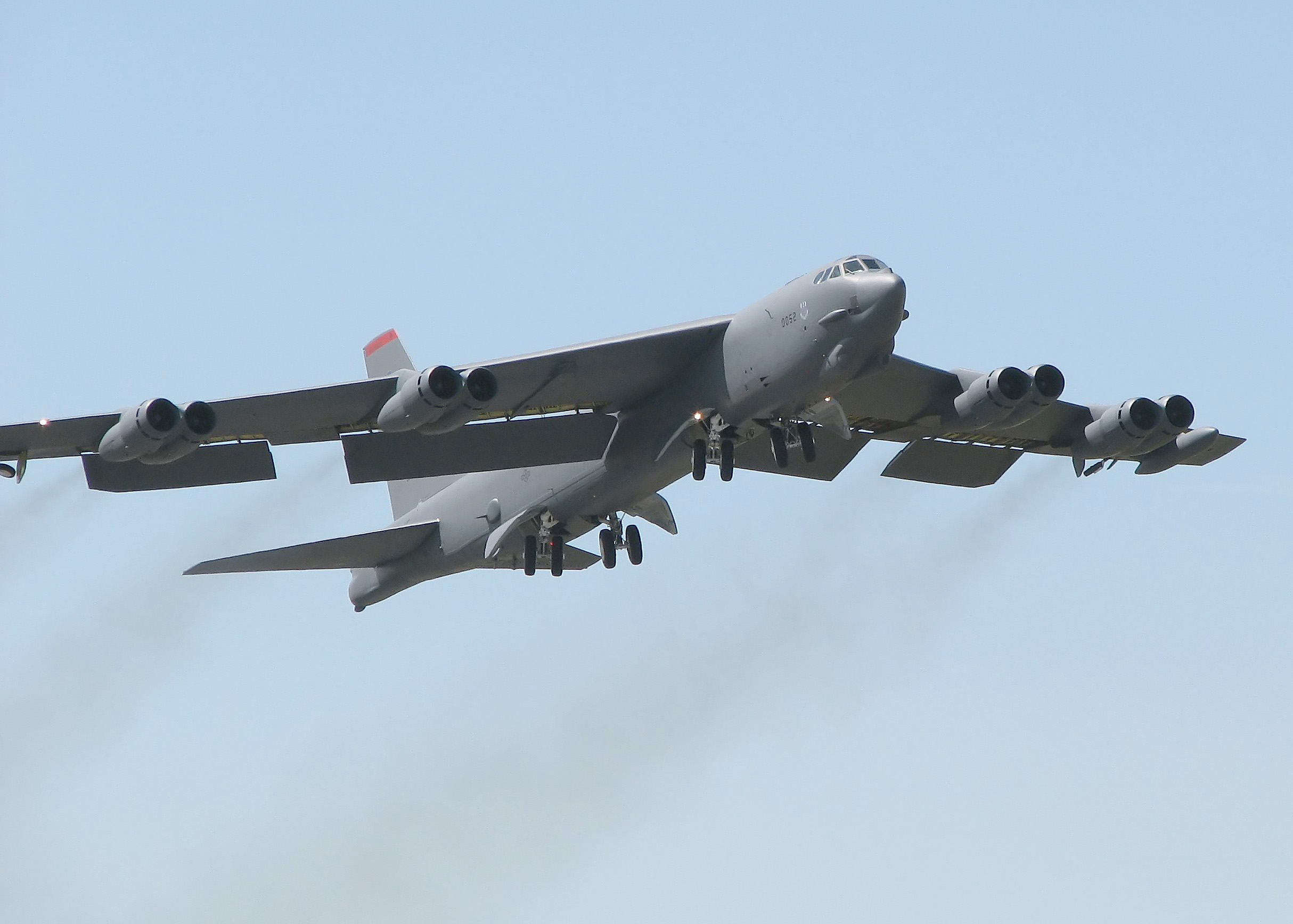
B-52 - Type of aircraft flown by Felices

In 1953, Felices flew 19 combat missions over North Korea, during the Korean War, as combat operations officer with the 344th Bombardment Squadron. In 1954, he was reassigned and stationed at Castle Air Force Base, California. In 1955, Felices completed the instructor course for the B-52

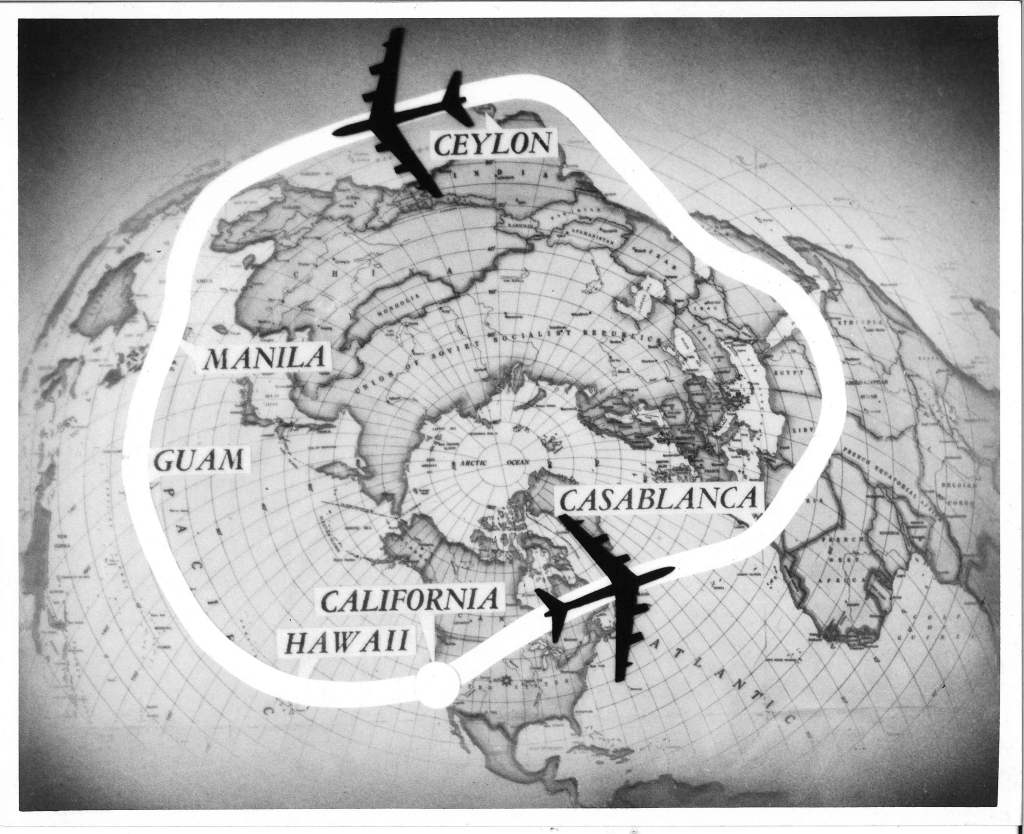
"Operation Power-Flite' was the first round-the-world nonstop flight by a jet airplane.

In January 1957, he participated in a historic project which was given to Fifteenth Air Force by the Strategic Air Command headquarters known as "Operation Power-Flite". "Operation Power-Flite" was the first around the world flight by an all-jet aircraft. He later completed a course on the KC-135 aircraft at the Boeing Company Ground School and participated in its flight test program. He wrote the first flight curriculum and initial qualification requirements for future SAC pilots.

In July 1957, Felices delivered the first KC-135 to SAC Headquarters and was the first to pilot the initial flight of a KC-135 made by the then-Joint Chiefs of Staff.

In 1958, he was awarded the Air Force Commendation Medal for landing a B-52 without the right rear landing gear.

== Vietnam War ==
Felices held various positions within the military and rose in rank. From 1964 to 1965, he attended the National War College. In June 1968, he was named commander of the 306th Bombardment Wing. He flew 39 combat bombing missions over North Vietnam during the Vietnam War in a B-52 aircraft. In 1969, he became the commander of the 823d Air Division at McCoy Air Force Base, Florida, which covered SAC bases and operating locations in Florida, Puerto Rico, North Carolina and Georgia. In May 1970, Felices was named Assistant Deputy Chief of Staff at Headquarters, Strategic Air Command at Offutt Air Force Base, Nebraska. In this capacity, he was responsible for SAC's intercontinental ballistic missile operational testing programs.

== Later years ==
Felices was promoted to the rank of major general on April 2, 1973, and in August of that year became the vice commander of Sixteenth Air Force, U.S. Air Forces in Europe at Torrejon Air Base, Spain.

Major General Salvador E. Felices retired from the United States Air Force on September 1, 1974.

He died of natural causes on July 14, 1987, while vacationing in Vienna, Austria. He was buried with full military honors in the United States Air Force Academy Cemetery at Colorado Springs, Colorado on July 31, 1987.

Felices was married to Shirley C. Gross with whom he had three children, Sherryl, Mark and Steven.

In 2020 Salvador E. Felices was posthumously inducted to the Puerto Rico Veterans Hall of Fame.

== Awards and decorations ==
Among Felices' decorations and medals were the following:

Air Force Distinguished Service Medal
Legion of Merit with two oak leaf clusters
Distinguished Flying Cross
Air Medal with two oak leaf clusters
Air Force Commendation Medal with two oak leaf clusters
Army Commendation Medal
Air Force Presidential Unit Citation
Air Force Outstanding Unit Award with two oak leaf clusters
National Defense Service Medal with one service star
Korean Service Medal with two service stars
Vietnam Service Medal with four service stars
Air Force Longevity Service Award with one oak leaf cluster
Small Arms Expert Marksmanship Ribbon
Republic of Korea Presidential Unit Citation
United Nations Korea Medal
Vietnam Campaign Medal

Badges:

- Command pilot
- Missile Badge

== See also ==
- List of Puerto Ricans
- List of Puerto Rican military personnel
- Hispanics in the United States Air Force
