= Carmelita Vigil-Schimmenti =

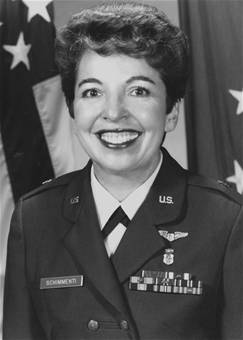
- Brigadier General Carmelita Vigil-Schimmenti; First Hispanic female to attain the rank of Brigadier General in US Air Force
- Born: December 16, 1936 (age 89); Albuquerque, New Mexico, U.S.
- Military career
- Allegiance: United States of America
- Branch: United States Air Force
- Service years: 1958-1988
- Rank: Brigadier General
- Conflicts: Vietnam War
- Awards: Air Force Distinguished Service Medal; Legion of Merit; Meritorious Service Medal with three oak leaf clusters Air Medal with oak leaf cluster Air Force Commendation Medal with oak leaf cluster

Brigadier General Carmelita Vigil-Schimmenti (born December 16, 1936) is a retired officer of the United States Air Force, who in 1985 became the first Hispanic female to attain the rank of Brigadier General. Vigil-Schimmenti was the Chief of the United States Air Force Nurse Corps, Office of the Surgeon General; Headquarters U.S. Air Force, Washington, D.C.

== Early years ==
Vigil-Schimmenti was born on December 16, 1936, in Albuquerque, New Mexico. She grew up on her family's ranch between Edgewood and Moriarty. She graduated from St. Mary's High School in 1954. In 1957, she earned her nursing diploma from the Regina School of Nursing of Albuquerque.

== Military career ==
Vigil-Schimmenti joined the U.S. Air Force in 1958 and was assigned to the Air Force Nurse Corps. From August 1958 until September 1960, she served as an operating room nurse and general duty nurse at the USAF Medical Center Wright-Patterson, Wright-Patterson Air Force Base in Ohio. During the time she served at the USAF Medical Center Wright-Patterson, she was able to complete the flight nurse course at Gunter Air Force Base in Alabama. In 1960, Vigil-Schimmenti was assigned as a general duty nurse at USAF Dispensary, Hickam Air Force Base, Hawaii, where she served until May 1962, when she was transferred to the 9th Aeromedical Evacuation Squadron, Tachikawa Air Base, Japan, where she was a flight nurse until August 1964.

In August 1964, Vigil-Schimmenti left to attend the University of Pittsburgh and earned a Bachelor of Science degree in 1966. In July 1966, she was assigned to the USAF School of Health Care Sciences, Sheppard Air Force Base, Texas, as an instructor in the Medical Service Specialist Course.

=== Vietnam War ===
Vigil-Schimmenti served in the Pacific during the Vietnam War. In June 1968, Vigil-Schimmenti, was named the charge nurse in the school health program and primary care screening nurse at USAF Dispensary, Kadena Air Base, Okinawa, Japan.

=== Return to the United States ===
In January 1971, she returned to the United States and was assigned to David Grant USAF Medical Center, Travis Air Force Base, California, as charge nurse emergency services and primary care clinic, charge nurse oncology clinic and home care service.

Vigil-Schimmenti attended the University of North Carolina at Chapel Hill from August 1973 until August 1974 and earned a Master of Public Health degree. Following graduate studies, she was transferred to Wilford Hall USAF Medical Center, Lackland Air Force Base, Texas, where she served as charge nurse, clinical coordinator and facility design coordinator.

Vigil-Schimmenti served in various positions until March 1983, when she was selected as command nurse, Headquarters Strategic Air Command, Offutt Air Force Base in Nebraska. In October 1985, Vigil-Schimmenti became the first Hispanic female to attain the rank of Brigadier General. She assumed the duties of Chief of the U. S. Air Force Nurse Corps, Office of the Surgeon General; Headquarters U.S. Air Force, Washington, D.C.

During her service years, Vigil-Schimmenti attended the Air War College and the Inter-Agency Institute. She retired from the Air Force on October 1, 1988.

=== Awards and recognitions ===
Among Brigadier General Carmelita Vigil-Schimmenti's decorations and medals were the following:

- Air Force Distinguished Service Medal
- Legion of Merit
- Meritorious Service Medal with oak leaf cluster,
- Air Force Commendation Medal
- National Defense Service Medal
- Armed Forces Expeditionary Medal
- Air Force Longevity Service Award Ribbon with five oak leaf clusters.

Badges:

- Flight Nurse Badge
- Air Force Medical Badge

== Later years ==
After retiring from the service in 1988, Vigil-Schimmenti returned to Albuquerque with her husband, retired Marine Lieutenant Colonel Joseph A. Schimmenti. Vigil-Schimmenti is a member of the American Nurses Association, Texas Nurses Association, Association of Military Surgeons of the United States, National League for Nursing, Air Force Association and the Aerospace Medical Association.

== See also ==
- Hispanics in the United States Air Force
