= Hispanics in the United States Air Force =

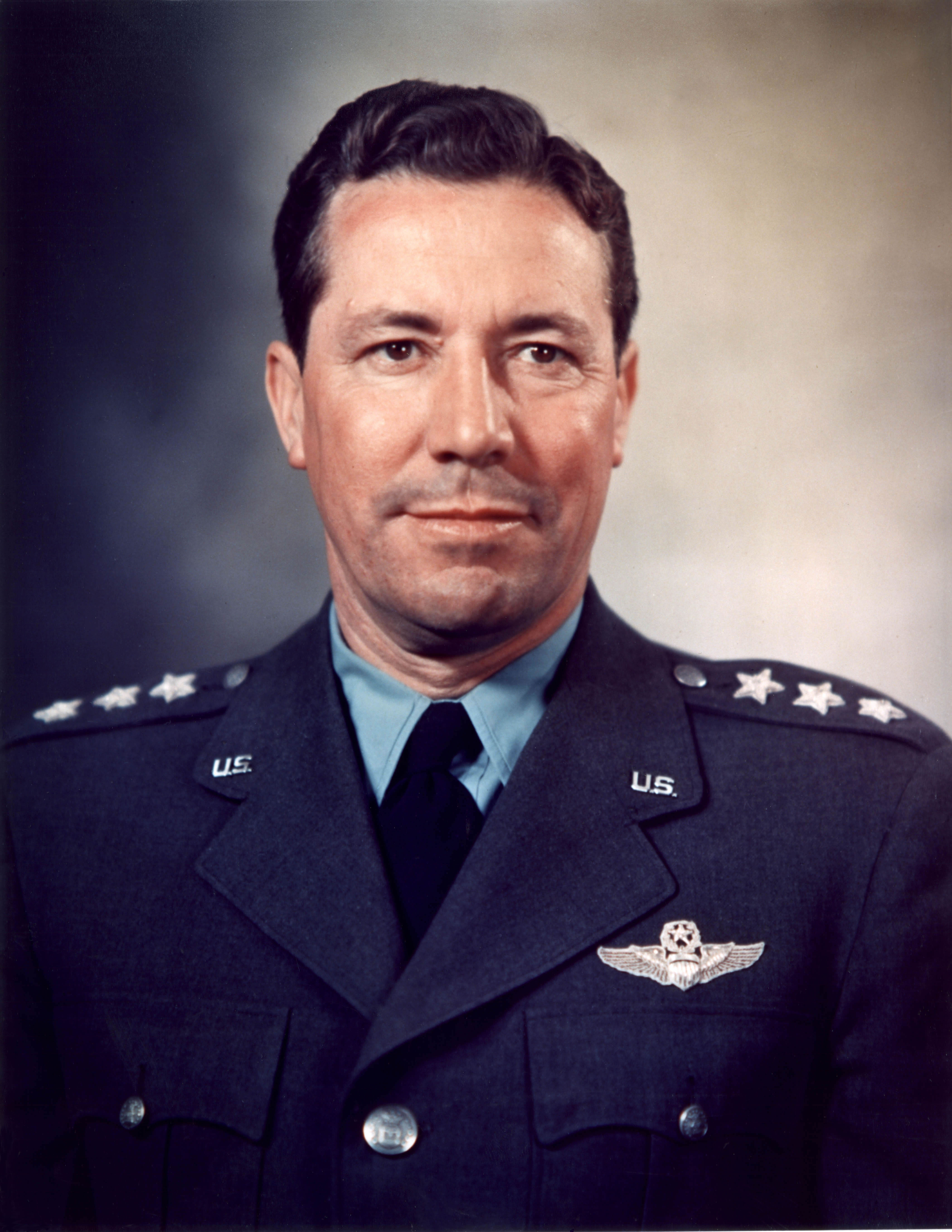
Elwood Richard Quesada

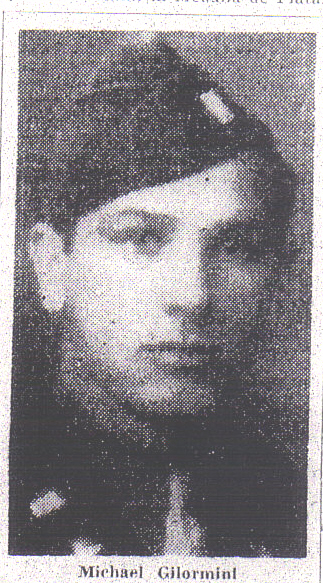
Mihiel Gilormini

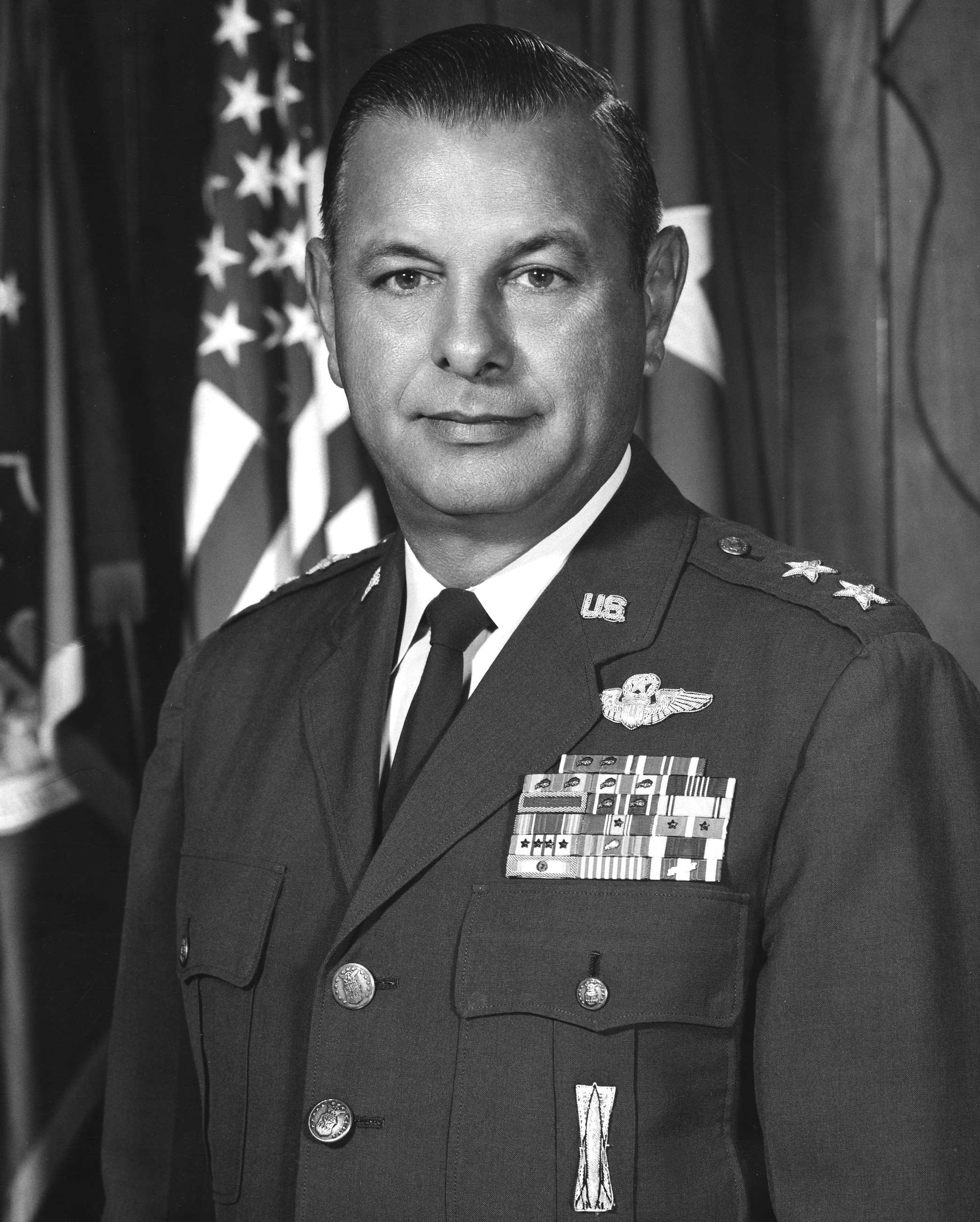
Salvador E. Felices

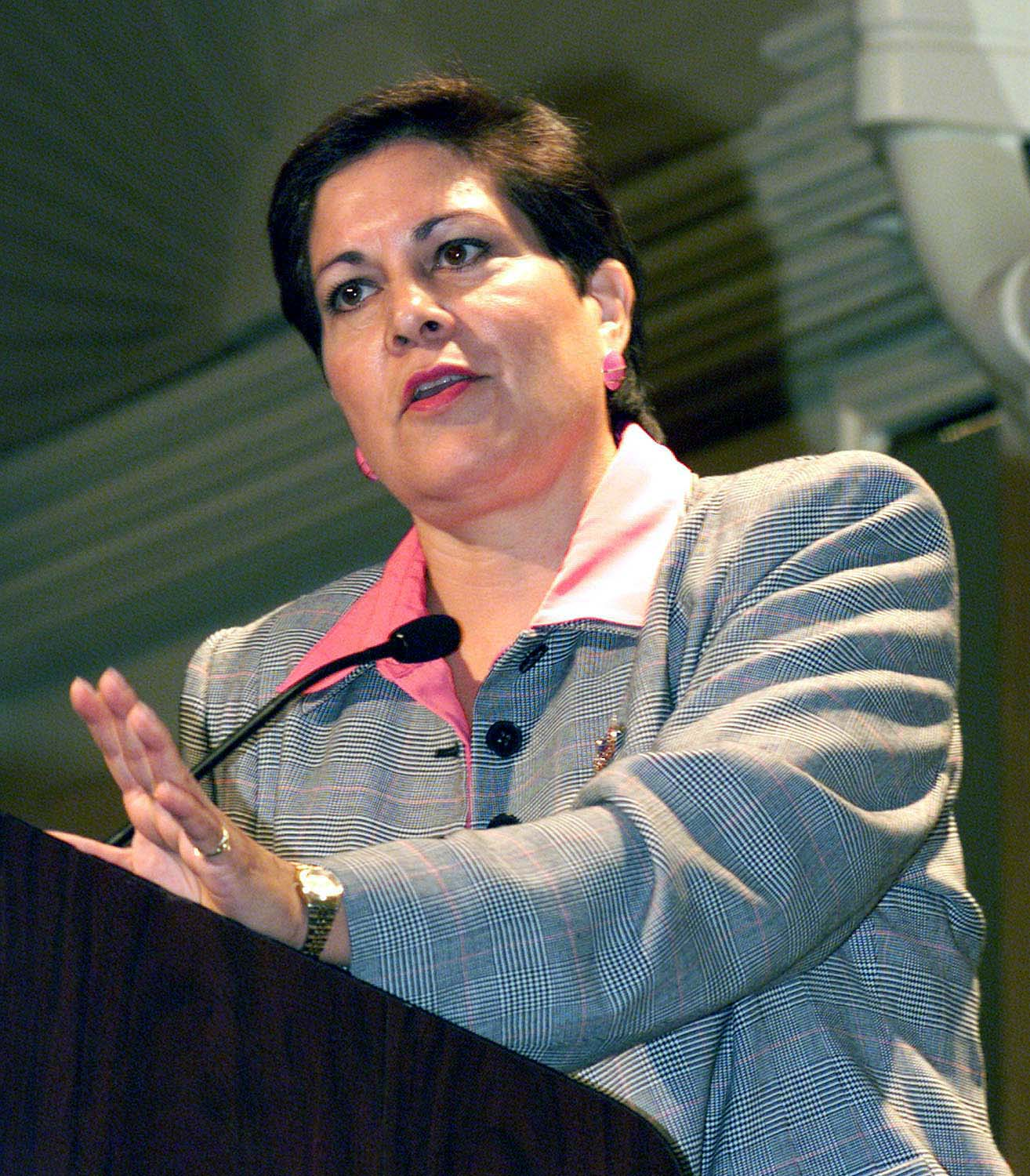
Linda Garcia Cubero

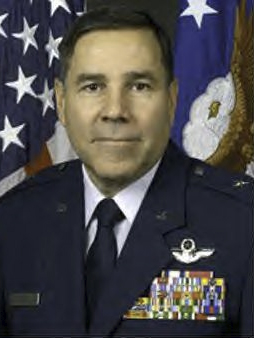
José M. Portela

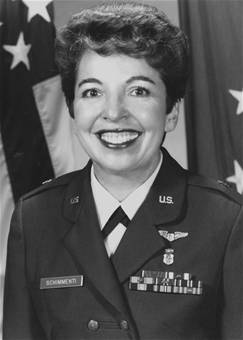
Carmelita Vigil-Schimmenti

Hispanics in the United States Air Force can trace their tradition of service back to the United States Army Air Forces (USAAF), the military aviation arm of the United States Army during and immediately after World War II. The USAAF was the predecessor of the United States Air Force, which was formed as a separate branch of the military on September 18, 1947, under the National Security Act of 1947. In the U.S., the term Hispanic categorizes any citizen or resident of the United States, of any racial background, of any country, and of any religion, who has at least one ancestor from the people of Spain or is of non-Hispanic origin but has an ancestor from Mexico, Puerto Rico, Cuba, Central or South America, or some other Hispanic origin. The three largest Hispanic groups in the United States are the Mexican-Americans, Puerto Ricans, and Cubans. According to the U.S. Census Bureau the estimated Hispanic population of the United States is over 50 million, or 16% of the U.S. population, and Hispanics are the nation's largest ethnic minority. The 2010 U.S. census estimate of over 50 million Hispanics in the U.S. does not include the 3.9 million residents of Puerto Rico, thereby making the people of Hispanic origin the nation's largest ethnic or race minority as of July 1, 2005.

Hispanics, both men and women, have reached the top ranks of the Air Force, serving their country in sensitive leadership positions on domestic and foreign shores. Hispanics, however currently account for a total of 4.9% of the enlisted personnel making the United States Air Force the military branch with the lowest average of Hispanic recruits.

== Prelude to World War II ==
Before the United States entered World War II, Hispanic Americans were already fighting on European soil in the Spanish Civil War. The Spanish Civil War was a major conflict in Spain that started after an attempted coup d'état by parts of the army, led by the Nationalist General Francisco Franco, against the government of the Second Spanish Republic. Hispanic Americans fought on behalf of both of the factions involved, the "Nationalists" as members of the Spanish Army and the "Loyalists" (Republicans) either as members of the Abraham Lincoln International Brigade or as aviators in the Yankee Squadron led by Bert Acosta (1895–1954).

== United States Army Air Forces and World War II ==
When the United States officially entered the war on December 7, 1941, Hispanic Americans were among the many American citizens who joined the ranks of the United States Armed Forces as volunteers or through the draft. Some Hispanics, such as Mihiel "Mike" Gilormini and Alberto A. Nido, served and fought for two different countries as members of the Royal Canadian Air Force and the British Royal Air Force before joining the United States Army Air Forces.

Those who were qualified pilots or had received private flying lesson were assigned to the newly formed United States Army Air Forces (USAAF) and served as active combatants in both the European and Pacific Theaters of war.

In 1944, Puerto Rican aviators were sent to the Tuskegee Army Air Field in Tuskegee, Alabama to train the famed 99th Fighter Squadron of the Tuskegee Airmen. The Tuskegee Airmen were the first African-American military aviators in the United States armed forces. Puerto Ricans were also involved in clerical positions with the Tuskegee unit. Among the Puerto Ricans who helped make the Tuskegee experiment a successful one were T/Sgt. Pablo Diaz Albortt, an NCO (Non Commissioned Officer) in charge of the Special Service Office, and Eugene Calderon, who was assigned to the "Red Tail" unit, as the Company Clerk. By the end of the war, the Tuskegee Airmen were credited with 109 Luftwaffe aircraft shot down, a patrol boat run aground by machine-gun fire, and destruction of numerous fuel dumps, trucks and trains.

=== The inherent flexibility of air power ===
Brig. Gen. Elwood R. Quesada

Among the Hispanics who played an instrumental role as a commander during the conflict was Brigadier General Elwood R. "Pete" Quesada, (1904–1993). Quesada, (who eventually would become a lieutenant general), was assigned as a brigadier general in October 1940 to intelligence in the Office of the Chief of Air Corps. He became commanding general of the 9th Fighter Command where he established advanced headquarters on the Normandy beachhead on D-Day plus one, and directed his planes in aerial cover and air support for the Allied invasion of the European continent. He was the foremost proponent of "the inherent flexibility of air power", a principle he helped prove during World War II.

In December 1942, Quesada took the First Air Defense Wing to North Africa. Shortly thereafter, he was given command of the XII Fighter Command and in this capacity would work out the mechanics of close air support and Army-Air Force cooperation.

The successful integration of air and land forces in the Tunisia campaign forged by Quesada and the Allied leaders became a blueprint for operations incorporated into Army Air Forces field regulations—FM 100-20, "Command and Employment of Air Power", first published on July 21, 1943—and provided the Allies with their first victory in the European war. Principles such as the co-equality of ground and air force commanders, centralized command of tactical aircraft to exploit "the inherent flexibility of air power", and the attainment of air superiority over the battlefield as a prerequisite for successful ground operations formed the core of tactical air doctrine. In October 1943, Quesada assumed command of the IX Fighter Command in England, and his forces provided air cover for the landings on Normandy Beach. Among Quesada's many military decorations were the Distinguished Service Medal with oak leaf cluster; Distinguished Flying Cross; Purple Heart and an Air Medal with two silver star devices.

=== Fighter pilots and bombardiers ===
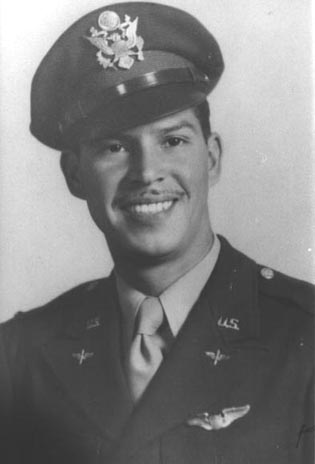
Lt. Oscar Francis Perdomo

A "flying ace" or fighter ace is a military aviator credited with shooting down five or more enemy aircraft during aerial combat. The term "ace in a day" is used to designate a fighter pilot who has shot down five or more enemy aircraft in a single day. Since World War I, a number of pilots have been honored as "Ace in a Day".

First Lieutenant Oscar F. Perdomo, (1919–1976), the son of Mexican parents, was born in El Paso, Texas. When the war broke out, Perdomo joined the United States Army Air Forces (USAAF) as an aviation cadet and was trained to pilot the P-47 Thunderbolt. After receiving his pilot training, he was assigned to the 464th Fighter Squadron, which was part of the 507th Fighter Group that was sent to the Pacific Island of Ie Shima off the west coast of Okinawa.

The atomic bomb was dropped on Nagasaki, Japan on August 9, 1945, but while the Allies awaited Japan's response to the demand to surrender, the war continued. On August 13, 1945, 1st Lt. Perdomo shot down four Nakajima Ki-84 "Frank" fighters and one Yokosuka K5Y "Willow" Type 93 biplane trainer. This action took place near Keijo/Seoul, Korea when 38 Thunderbolts of the 507th Fighter Group encountered approximately 50 enemy aircraft. This action was Lt. Perdomo's tenth and final combat mission, and the five confirmed victories made him an "Ace in a Day" and earned him the distinction of being the last "Ace" of World War II. He was awarded the Distinguished Service Cross for extraordinary heroism in action and the Air Medal with one oak leaf cluster.

Lieutenant Colonel Donald S. Lopez Sr., USAAF fighter ace was assigned to the 23rd Fighter Group under the command of General Claire Chennault. The mission of the fighter group (the "Flying Tigers") was to help defend Chinese nationals against Japanese invaders. During 1943–1944, Lopez was credited with shooting down five Japanese fighters, four in a Curtiss P-40 and one in a North American P-51.

Captain Michael Brezas, USAAF fighter ace, arrived in Lucera, Italy during the summer of 1944, joining the 48th Fighter Squadron of the 14th Fighter Group. Flying the P-38 aircraft, Lt. Brezas downed 12 enemy planes within two months. He received the Silver Star Medal, the Distinguished Flying Cross, and the Air Medal with eleven oak leaf clusters.

Captain Mihiel "Mike" Gilormini, Royal Air Force and USAAF, was a flight commander whose last combat mission was attacking the airfield at Milano, Italy. His last flight in Italy gave air cover for General George C. Marshall's visit to Pisa. Gilormini was the recipient of the Silver Star Medal, five Distinguished Flying Crosses, and the Air Medal with four oak leaf clusters.

Captain Alberto A. Nido, Royal Canadian Air Force, the British Royal Air Force and the USAAF. He flew missions as a bomber pilot for the RCAF and as a Supermarine Spitfire fighter pilot for the RAF. As member of the RAF, he belonged to 67th Reconnaissance Squadron who participated in 275 combat missions. Nido later transferred to the USAAF's 67th Fighter Group as a P-51 Mustang fighter pilot. He was awarded the Distinguished Flying Cross with four oak leaf clusters and the Air Medal with four oak leaf clusters.

Captain Robert L. Cardenas, USAAF, served as a B-24 aircraft pilot in the European Theater of Operations with the 506th Bombardment Squadron. He was awarded the Air Medal and two oak leaf clusters for bombing missions before being shot down over Germany in March 1944. Despite head wounds from flak, he made his way back to Allied control.

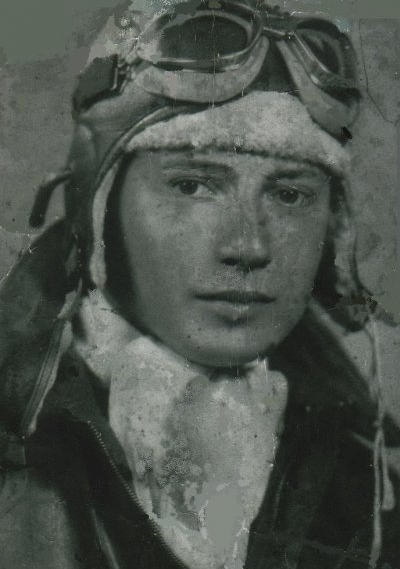
2nd Lt. González, the first USAAF Puerto Rican pilot

2nd Lieutenant César Luis González, a co-pilot of a C-47, was the first Puerto Rican pilot in the United States Army Air Forces. He was one of the initial participants of the invasion of Sicily on July 10, 1943, also known as Operation Husky. During the invasion of Sicily, he flew on two night missions, the first on July 9, where his mission was to release paratroops of 82nd Airborne Division on the area of Gela and the second on July 11, when he dropped reinforcements in the area. His unit was awarded a "DUC" for carrying out this second mission in spite of bad weather and heavy attack by enemy ground and naval forces. González died on November 22, 1943, when his plane crashed during training off the end of the runway at Castelvetrano. He was posthumously promoted to first lieutenant

Lieutenant Richard Gomez Candelaria, USAAF, was a P-51 Mustang pilot from the 435th Fighter Squadron of the 479th Fighter Group. With six aerial victories to his credit, Candelaria was the only pilot in his squadron to make "ace". Most of his victories were achieved on a single mission on April 7, 1945, when he found himself the lone escort protecting a formation of USAAF B-24 Liberators. Candelaria defended the bombers from at least 15 German fighters, single-handedly destroying four before help arrived. He was also credited with a probable victory on an Me 262 during this engagement. Six days later, Candelaria was shot down by ground fire, and spent the rest of the war as a POW. After the war, Candelaria served in the Air National Guard, reaching the rank of Colonel prior to his retirement.

Lt. Francisco Mercado Jr. awarded the Distinguished Flying Cross by General Leon W. Johnson

Lieutenant Francisco Mercado Jr., USAAF, flew 35 combat missions as a bombardier over enemy occupied Continental Europe as a member of the 853rd Bomb Squadron, 491st Bomb Group, 8th Air Force. He was awarded the Air Medal with four Oak Leaf Cluster and the Distinguished Flying Cross. He flew ten missions as the Squadron Lead Bombardier, and one as the Group Lead Bombardier on December 30, 1944, on a mission to the Railroad Bridge at Altenahr, Germany. On July 21, 1944, he earned a membership into the exclusive "Caterpillar Club" after he parachuted over England while returning from a mission with a crippled B-24.

Lieutenant José Antonio Muñiz served with distinction in the China-Burma-India Theater. During his tour of duty he flew 20 combat missions against the Imperial Japanese Army Air Force and shot down a Mitsubishi A6M Zero.

Major Vicente T. Ximenes graduated from Bombardier School at Kirtland Air Force Base as a second lieutenant in 1941. During the war, Ximenes flew 50 missions as a lead bombardier in North Africa and was later awarded the Distinguished Flying Cross for bravery under fire. After serving in the war, he became an Air Force flying instructor at the Goodfellow Air Force Base from 1943 to 1946.

Technical Sergeant Clement Resto, USAAF, was not an "ace" but served with the 303rd Bomb Group and participated in numerous bombing raids over Germany. During a bombing mission over Duren, Germany, Resto's plane, a B-17, was shot down. He was captured by the Gestapo and sent to Stalag XVII-B where he spent the rest of the war as a prisoner of war. Resto, who lost an eye during his last mission, was awarded a Purple Heart, a POW Medal and an Air Medal with one battle star after he was liberated from captivity.

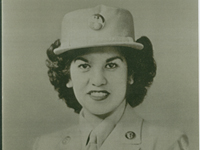
Staff Sergeant Eva Romero Jacques

Corporal Frank Medina, USAAF, was an air crew member on a B-24 that was shot down over Italy. He was the only crew member to evade capture. Medina explained that his ability to speak Spanish had allowed him to communicate with friendly Italians who helped him avoid capture for eight months behind enemy lines.

When Staff Sergeant Ernest Gallego, USAAF tried to enlist, he was too young and when he was finally of age, he failed the depth perception test and therefore chose gunnery school. Gallego and his crew flew on many missions from their base in Italy.

One of the first Hispanic women to serve in the USAAF was Staff Sergeant Eva Romero Jacques. Jacques had three years of college and she spoke both Spanish and English. She spent two years in the Pacific Theater. She spent 1944, in New Guinea and 1945 in the Philippines, as an administrative aide. She survived a plane disaster when the craft in which she was on crashed in the jungles of New Guinea.

== United States Air Force ==
The United States Air Force was formed as a separate branch of the military on September 18, 1947, under the National Security Act of 1947. That same year Quesada was promoted to lieutenant general and appointed as the first commander of the Tactical Air Command (TAC). However, Quesada quickly became disillusioned as he saw how TAC was being ignored while funding and promotions were largely going to the Strategic Air Command. In December 1948, Air Force Chief of Staff Hoyt Vandenberg stripped TAC of its planes and pilots and reduced its status to that of a planning headquarters under the newly formed Continental Air Command. Quesada protested and asked for a reassignment. In 1951, Quesada requested an early retirement from the Air Force.

Among the Hispanics who continued to serve in the newly formed Air Force where Major Oscar F. Perdomo, who retired in 1950, Lieutenant Colonel Donald S. Lopez Sr., who was an associate professor of thermodynamics at the United States Air Force Academy, retiring from the Air Force in 1964.

Captain Robert Cardenas, who piloted the XB-42 Mixmaster and XB-43 Jetmaster, was assigned chief test pilot for bomber aircraft and flew all prototypes of that class for the next four years. On October 14, 1947, Cardenas was named officer in charge of operations and was the command pilot for the B-29 Superfortress that launched the X-1 experimental rocket plane in which Chuck Yeager became the first man to fly faster than the speed of sound. In 1948, then-Major Cardenas was the Officer in Charge of Flight Test Division at Muroc Air Force Base and was Chief Air Force Test Pilot of the Northrop YB-49 flying wing.

Colonel Mihiel Gilormini, was named base commander to the 198th Fighter Squadron in Puerto Rico. Gilormini and Colonel Alberto A. Nido, together with Lieutenant Colonel José Antonio Muñiz, played an instrumental role in the creation of the Puerto Rico Air National Guard on November 23, 1947. The Puerto Rico Air National Guard is a part of the Air Reserve Component (ARC) of the United States Air Force. Both Gilormini and Nido were eventually promoted to brigadier general and served as commanders of PRANG. In 1963, the Air National Guard Base, at the San Juan International airport in Puerto Rico, was renamed "Muñiz Air National Guard Base" in honor of Lt. Col. José Antonio Muñiz who perished on July 4, 1960, when his F-86 crashed during takeoff during the 4th of July festivities in Puerto Rico.

== Korean War ==
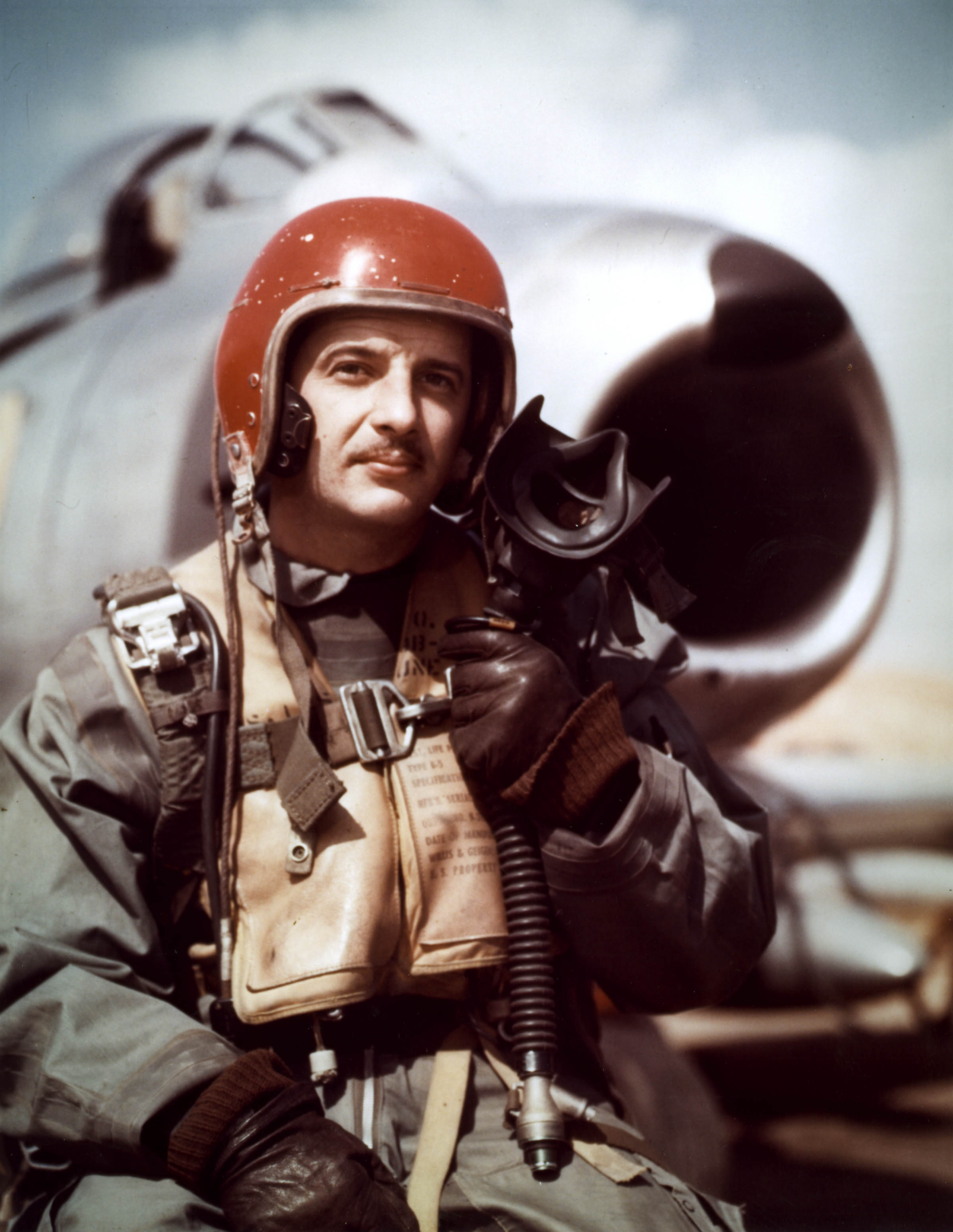
Capt. Manuel J. Fernandez Jr.

The Korean War was an escalation of a civil war between two rival Korean regimes, each of which was supported by external powers, with each trying to topple the other through political and guerrilla tactics. The conflict was expanded by the United States and the Soviet Union's involvement as part of the larger Cold War. The main hostilities were during the period from June 25, 1950, until the armistice (ceasefire agreement) was signed on July 27, 1953.

In July 1950, there were about 20,000 Hispanics in the armed forces. Over the next three years, nearly 148,000 Hispanic-Americans volunteered for or were drafted into military service. As in other conflicts, Hispanics fought as members of the Armed Forces.

In 1953, Salvador E. Felices, who joined the Air Force in 1947, flew in 19 combat missions over North Korea, during the Korean War, as combat operation officer for the 344th Bombardment Squadron. In 1954, he was reassigned and stationed at the Castle Air Force Base in California. He was assigned in 1952, to the 303rd Bombardment Wing as the 359th Bombardment Squadron operations officer. Felices participated in a bombing competition, using a B-29 Superfortress equipped with an APQ-7 radar set and a Norden bombsight rate head. This would eventually lead the way to the development of the current techniques of synchronous radar bombing used today.

During the war, Orlando Llenza flew as a pilot in the 9th Air Refueling Squadron. During his career he flew the T-6 Texan, B-25 Mitchell, Boeing KB-29M tanker, KC-97 Stratofreighter tanker, T-33 Shooting Star, F-86 Sabre D, E, F and H models, F-104 Starfighter, and the C-47 Skytrain, C-54 Skymaster, C-131 Samaritan transports. After Llenza retired from active duty he was named Adjutant General of the Puerto Rico National Guard by Puerto Rico's Governor Carlos Romero Barceló, a position which he held from 1977 to 1983. He retired with the rank of major general.

Capt. Manuel John "Pete" Fernandez, was the third-leading American ace in the Korean War. Fernandez had 14.5 kills during his 9 months in Korea. Prior to this Capt Fernandez, who joined the Air Force's predecessor, the USAAF during WW II, was an advanced instructor at Nellis Air Force Base Gunnery School in Las Vegas, NV.

Cardenas was assigned to Wright Field and Edwards Air Force Base testing new fighters and bombers during the Korean War, he was assigned to Wright Field and Edwards Air Force Base testing new fighters and bombers.

== Post Korean War ==
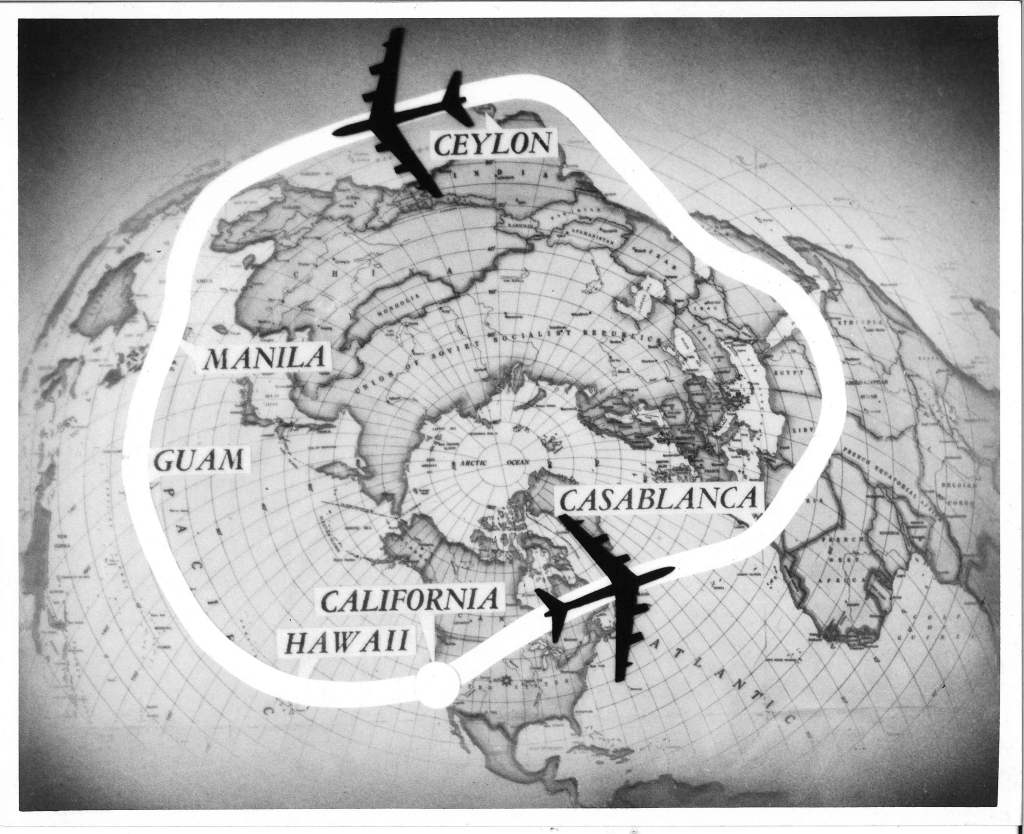
"Operation Power-Flite' was the first round-the-world nonstop flight by a jet airplane.

In 1955, Felices completed the instructor course for the B-52. In January 1957, he participated in a historic project that was given to Fifteenth Air Force by the Strategic Air Command headquarters known as "Operation Power-Flite". Operation Power-Flite was the first around the world flight by an all-jet aircraft. He later completed a course on the KC-135 aircraft at the Boeing Company Ground School and participated in its flight test program. He wrote the first flight curriculum and initial qualification requirements for future SAC pilots. In July 1957, Felices delivered the first KC-135 to SAC Headquarters and he was the first to pilot the first flight of a KC-135 made by the then joint Chiefs of Staff. In 1958, he was awarded the Air Force Commendation Medal for landing a B-52 without the right rear landing gear.

Carmelita Vigil-Schimmenti joined the Air Force in 1958 and held clinical, teaching and administrative positions all over the world.

== Vietnam War ==
The war was fought between the communist North Vietnam, supported by its communist allies, and the government of South Vietnam, supported by the United States and other nations. The United States entered the war to prevent a communist takeover of South Vietnam as part of their wider strategy of containment. Military advisors arrived beginning in 1950. U.S. involvement escalated in the early 1960s and combat units were deployed beginning in 1965. Involvement peaked in 1968 at the time of the Tet Offensive. The U.S. government did not begin keeping separate statistics on Hispanics until 1979. Therefore, the exact number of Hispanics who served in the Air Force during the Vietnam War era is unknown. The statistics that were kept by the Department of Defense, in accordance to the Vietnam War Statistics, included Hispanics among Caucasians.

Then Colonel Cardenas flew F-105 Thunderchief combat missions during the war and was later assigned to McConnell AFB as a trainer for the F-105. In 1968, Colonel Cardenas was promoted to brigadier general and assigned to command of the Air Force Special Operations Force at Eglin Air Force Base. Following his assignment to Eglin AFB, he became vice commander of the 16th Air Force in Spain. In 1968, Colonel Cardenas was promoted to brigadier general and assigned to Command of the Air Force Special Operations Force at Eglin Air Force Base. Following his assignment to Eglin AFB, he became vice commander of the 16th Air Force in Spain. There he negotiated with Muammar al-Gaddafi the withdrawal of US forces from Wheelus Air Base in Libya. Cardenas retired as a brigadier general in 1973.

Major General Salvador E. Felices held various positions within the military. In June 1968, he was named commander of the 306th Bombardment Wing. He flew 39 combat bombing missions over North Vietnam during the Vietnam War in a B-52 aircraft. In 1969, he became the commander of the 823rd Air Division which covered the regions of Florida, Puerto Rico, North Carolina and Georgia. In May 1970, Felices was named Assistant Deputy Chief of Staff at the Headquarters of Strategic Air Command. He was responsible for SAC's intercontinental ballistic missile operational testing programs.

Brigadier General Antonio Maldonado, who in 1967 became the youngest pilot and aircraft commander of a B-52 Stratofortress nuclear bomber, was assigned in January 1971, to the 432nd Tactical Fighter Reconnaissance Wing, Udon Royal Thai Air Force Base in Thailand. His active participation in the war included 183 air combat missions over North and South Vietnam, Laos and Cambodia logging more than 400 combat flying hours in the F-4C Phantom.

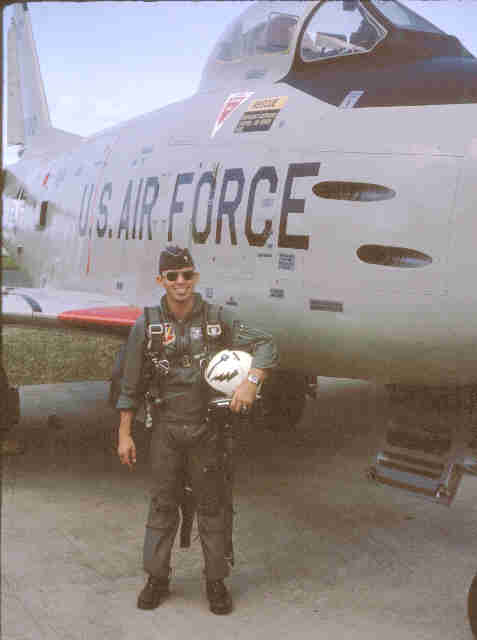
An F-86H, one of the fighter planes flown by Colonel Negroni

Brigadier General Antonio J. Ramos, was a lieutenant in November 1971, assigned to the 310th Tactical Airlift Squadron, Phan Rang Air Base and Tan Son Nhut Air Base, South Vietnam. In August 1972, was transferred to U-Tapao Royal Thai Naval Airfield in Thailand where he was the Base Operations Officer until November 1972.

Brigadier General Jose M. Portela, as a first lieutenant, was sent to the Republic of Vietnam during the war and participated in numerous combat missions. On June 8, 1972, he was promoted to captain and in September 1972, was reassigned to the 3rd Military Airlift Squadron at Charleston Air Force Base, South Carolina as a C-5 pilot. During his stint there he was assigned to the C-141s and in 1972 became the youngest C-141 Starlifter aircraft commander and captain at the age of 22. He served at CAF until July 1973, when he joined the Air Force Reserve as a C-5A Initial Cadre at the 312th Airlift Squadron at Travis Air Force Base in California.

Brigadier General Ruben A. Cubero was a captain when he was sent to the Republic of Vietnam in May 1969 and was assigned to the 1st Brigade, 25th Infantry Division, 19th Tactical Air Support Squadron, Tay Ninh West where he flew an OV-10 and served as a forward air controller. In November 1969, he was reassigned to the 19th Tactical Air Support Squadron, at Bien Hoa Air Base.

Colonel Hector Andres Negroni, was a captain when he participated in combat missions during the war and accumulated over 600 combat hours. During his tour he served in the 553rd Reconnaissance Squadron stationed in Korat, Thailand and as Chief of Combat Operation in the 7th Airborne Command and Control Squadron in Udon, Thailand.

Brigadier General Carmelita Vigil-Schimmenti obtained a Bachelor of Science in nursing in 1966 and a Masters of Arts in public health in 1974. She attended the Air Force Flight Nurse School, the Air War College and the Inter-Agency Institute. Vigil-Schimmenti served in the Pacific during the Vietnam War. In June 1968, Vigil-Schimmenti, was named the charge nurse in the school health program and primary care screening nurse at USAF Dispensary, Kadena Air Base, Okinawa.

== Operation El Dorado Canyon ==
On April 15, 1986, Major Fernando L. Ribas-Dominicci was one of the pilots who participated in the Libyan air raid, known as Operation El Dorado Canyon, as member of the 48th Tactical Fighter Wing. His F-111F was shot down in action over the disputed Gulf of Sidra off the Libyan coast. Ribas-Dominicci and his weapons systems officer, Capt. Paul Lorence, were the only U.S. casualties of said operation. Both men's names are engraved in the F-111 "Vark" Memorial Park located in Clovis, New Mexico. Ribas-Dominicci was awarded the Purple Heart and posthumously promoted to the rank of major, effective April 15, 1986.

== September 11 attacks ==
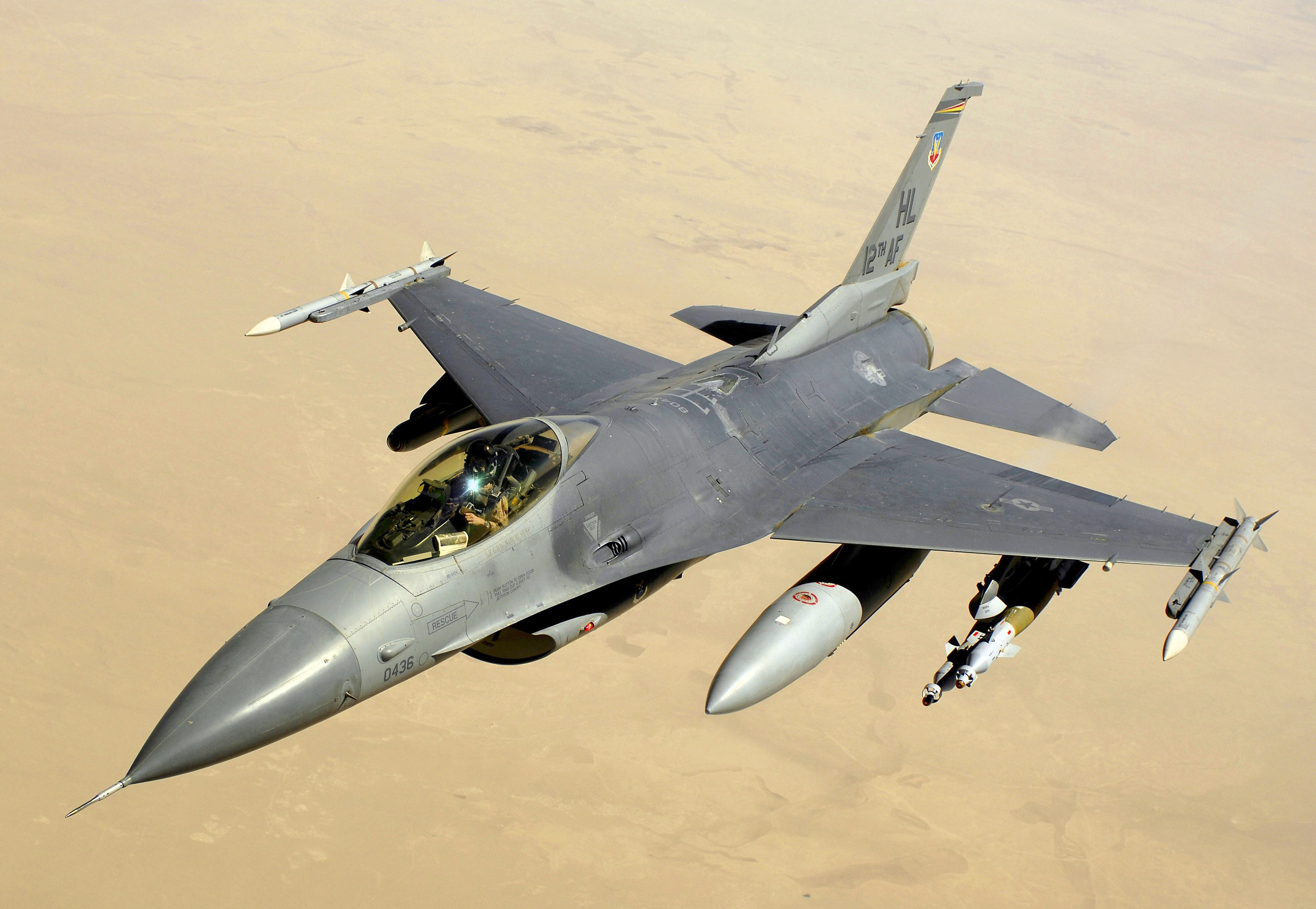
An F-16, the type of aircraft used by Lt. Col. Sasseville during the September 11 attacks

On September 11, 2001, United Airlines Flight 93 was hijacked by four members of al-Qaeda terrorists as part of the September 11 attacks. The hijackers breached the aircraft's cockpit and overpowered the flight crew approximately 46 minutes after takeoff. Ziad Jarrah, a trained pilot, then took control of the aircraft and diverted it back toward the east coast of the United States in the direction of Washington, D.C. The hijackers' specific target was the United States Capitol.

Lieutenant Colonel Marc H. Sasseville, of Puerto Rican heritage, called Brigadier General David Wherley, the commander of the 113th Wing, to get permission to use their "war-reserve missiles.

Four pilots were available for the mission and received authorization to get airborne in their fighter jets, among them Lieutenant Colonel Marc Sasseville and Lieutenant Heather Penney.

The mission was to find United Airlines Flight 93 and destroy it however they could. Since the fighter jets were absent of missiles and packed only with dummy ammunition from a recent training mission, there was only one way to do it and that was by ramming the aircraft. Sasseville, flew his aircraft alongside the aircraft of Lt. Penney. According to Penney, Sasseville told her: "We don't train to bring down airliners. If you just hit the engine, it could still glide and you could guide it to a target". He also told her that he would take out the cockpit and that she should take the tail. The fighter jets passed over the ravaged Pentagon building, however it was not until hours later that they would find out that United 93 had already gone down in a field outside Shanksville, Pennsylvania, killing all 44 people aboard including the 4 hijackers.

In 2001, Noel Zamot was assigned to the Directorate of Operations, United States Space Command, Paterson Air Force Base in Colorado as Deputy Chief of Operations Integration. According to the United States Air Force, Zamot's mission as Deputy Chief of Operations in the aftermath of the September 11 attacks was to integrate emerging national capabilities into a joint counter terrorism operation. He developed concepts for long-term Information Operations and Space Control activities for the US enabling a multi-spectral combat response. He was also involved in the development of the Special Access Program (SAP) systems and in the development of new counter-space capabilities which resulted in a more effective counter-terrorism operation across 3 combat zones.

=== U.S. Central Command Headquarters at Qatar ===
Colonel Evelio Otero Jr. helped establish the U.S. Central Command Headquarters at Qatar. When the United States military began Operations Enduring Freedom and Iraqi Freedom, Otero was called upon to establish the Intelligence Division which supported the military operations. The first Sensitive Site Exploitation of the Baath Party Headquarters in Baghdad was led by Otero. He was promoted to colonel in 2004 and as Chief Coalition Intelligence Center in the Central Command at MacDill Air Force Base. His assignment included multiple trips to the Coalition Intelligence Center in Iraq where he worked on Detainee Interrogation Release Parameters. He founded the Polish and Colombian Joint Special Operations Commands while he was assigned to United States Special Operations Command.

== United States Air Force Academy ==
The United States Air Force Academy (USAFA or Air Force), located immediately north of Colorado Springs in El Paso County, Colorado, United States, is an institution for the undergraduate education of officers for the United States Air Force. Graduates of the four-year program receive a Bachelor of Science degree and most are commissioned as second lieutenants in the United States Air Force. As of 2010, Hispanics made up 10% of the academy's student body.

In 1961, Héctor Andrés Negroni earned a Bachelor of Science degree in engineering with a major in public affairs in the Air Force Academy making him one of the first Hispanics to graduate from said academy. Negroni was commissioned a second lieutenant in the United States Air Force and was awarded his navigator wings.

On October 7, 1975, President Gerald R. Ford signed legislation permitting women to enter the United States service academies. On June 26, 1976, Captain Linda Garcia Cubero was among 157 women that entered the Air Force Academy with the Class of 1980. In 1980, Cubero made history when she became a member of the first class of women to graduate from the United States Air Force Academy. There she earned her BS degree in political science and her free-fall parachute wings. Upon her graduation she was commissioned a second lieutenant.

In July 1991, Ruben A. Cubero was named dean of the faculty, becoming the first person of Hispanic heritage in that position. As dean of the faculty, Cubero commanded the 865-member dean of the faculty mission element and oversaw the annual design and instruction of more than 500 undergraduate courses to 4,000 cadets in 19 academic departments. He led and supervised four support staff agencies and directed the operation of faculty resources involving more than $250 million. Cubero established the Air Force Academy's first Cooperative Research and Development Agreement. On August 3, 1991, Cubero was promoted to the rank of brigadier general. Cubero retired from the Air Force on July 1, 1998. He had more than 6,000 flight hours.

=== United States Air Force's elite Test Pilot School ===
In 2010, Colonel Noel Zamot was named Commander of the United States Air Force's elite Test Pilot School, located in Edwards Air Force Base, California. Among his duties was to provide program management to eight flight research programs, liaising with international partners, and providing academic oversight for a Master's level engineering program. He created nation's first system for testing complex military systems in contested cyberspace. Other achievements during his tenure include:

- 2011—First Remotely Piloted Aircraft (RPA) test pilot
- 2012—Flight test course for enlisted personnel
- 2012—Cyber Systems Test Course introduced

Zamot retired from the United States Air Force in 2012, after 25 years of military service.

== Sensitive leadership positions ==
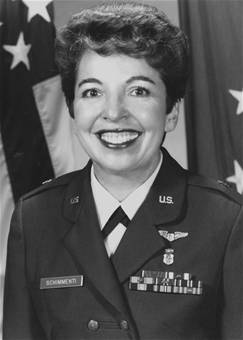
Brigadier General Carmelita Vigil-Schimmenti

In 1973, Héctor Andrés Negroni was assigned to the 317th Tactical Airlift Wing, Pope Air Force Base, North Carolina, serving as an aircraft commander, flight commander, assistant operations officer, and wing chief of aircrew training. He was promoted to lieutenant colonel in 1977 and became the Commander of the 3rd Mobile Aerial Port Squadron. In 1978, he was named the chief of liaison for the Joint United States Military Group in Spain. The Spanish Government presented Negroni with its highest Air Force peacetime award, the Aeronautical Merit Cross for his contributions to the successful implementation of the United States-Spain Treaty of Friendship and Cooperation and in 1981 promoted to Colonel.

José M. Portela served in the position of Assistant Adjutant General for Air while also serving as commander of the Puerto Rico Air National Guard. Portela is the only reservist ever to serve as director of mobility forces for Bosnia. Besides the Vietnam War, he also participated in the following military operations: The Persian Gulf War, Operation Just Cause in Panama and Operation Desert Shield/Storm. Portela retired with the rank of brigadier general.

Lieutenant General Leo Marquez was the deputy chief of staff for logistics and engineering, Headquarters U.S. Air Force, Washington, D.C. He was awarded a commission through the Air Force Reserve Officer's Training Corps program upon graduation from New Mexico State University and entered active duty as a second lieutenant in the U.S. Air Force in November 1954. In June 1979 he became deputy chief of staff for plans and programs at Headquarters Air Force Logistics Command, Wright-Patterson Air Force Base, Ohio. Marquez served as commander of Ogden Air Logistics Center, Hill Air Force Base, Utah, from July 1981 to July 1983. Marquez, who retired on August 1, 1987, was promoted to lieutenant general on August 1, 1983.

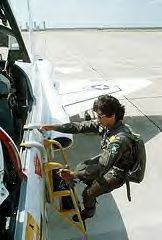
Then Lieutenant Custodio climbing down from the cockpit of a T-38

In 1980, then Lieutenant Olga E. Custodio made history when she became the first female Hispanic U.S. military pilot. She holds the distinction of being first Latina to complete U.S. Air Force military pilot training. One of her assignments in the military was that of instructor pilot where she was the first female Northrop T-38 Talon (T-38) UPT flight instructor at Laughlin AFB. After retiring in 2003, with the rank lieutenant colonel, she became the first Latina to become a commercial airline captain.

In April 1984, Antonio Maldonado was transferred to K.I. Sawyer Air Force Base in Michigan. During the years which he spent there (1984–1987) he assumed various leadership positions: Deputy Commander for Operations (1984), 410th Bombardment Wing; Vice Commander (September 1984)and Commander(July 1985). While commanding the 410th, General Maldonado won numerous top Air Force awards including the coveted Omaha Trophy (best combat Wing) and the 390th Bombardment Group Memorial Trophy (best Wing Commander). In May 1987, Maldonado was reassigned once more to the Pentagon where he served as Chief, Strategic Operations Division, Operations Directorate, Office of the Joint Chiefs of Staff. In June 1988 he became Deputy Director for Operations, National Military Command Center, the Pentagon. On September 1 of that same year, he was promoted to the rank of Brigadier General. In July 1989, Maldonado was named Chief, U.S. Office of Defense Cooperation, Madrid, Spain, becoming the senior Department of Defense representative to that country. His responsibilities included providing overall direction to U.S. elements in Spain on status of forces, security assistance programs and other defense and base agreement matters. He also provided overall coordination for US offensive operations out of Spain during the 1991 Persian Gulf War. Brigadier General Maldonado retired from the United States Air Force on September 1, 1991, with more than 4,000 hours of flight, after 27 years of service of active duty service.

In 1985, Carmelita Vigil-Schimmenti became the first Hispanic female to attain the rank of brigadier general in the Air Force and was the first female general from New Mexico. She received her nursing diploma from Regina School of Nursing in Albuquerque. Because of her work on the base, she decided to join the military as a nurse. Vigil-Schimmenti retired from the Air Force in October, 1988.

In 1992, Graciela Tiscareño-Sato became the first documented Hispanic female to earn an Air Medal for combat air operations. A First Lieutenant at the time, Tiscareño-Sato served as a navigator on board the KC-135R aerial refueling tanker, flying dozens of O-1 sorties over Baghdad refueling combat air patrol fighters during Operation Southern Watch upon the end of Operation Desert Storm. This was her first of many deployments and took place before Congress lifted the Combat Exclusion Law for women and before women were allowed to be assigned to combat aircraft.

Tiscareño-Sato was born to Mexican immigrants in El Paso, Texas in 1967 and grew up in Colorado as the oldest of five Mexican-America children. She left her family home to attend the University of California at Berkeley on an Air Force ROTC Scholarship. She majored in Architecture and Environmental Design while completing the Aerospace Studies program required of all cadets. After graduation, she was commissioned atop the Berkeley campanile by her parents, Arturo and Agustina Tiscareño and received a regular commission as an AFROTC Distinguished Graduate. She completed Undergraduate Navigator Training at Mather Air Force base in March 1991, the only woman in her class. Tiscareño-Sato was promoted to the rank of captain in 1994 and deployed all over the globe in both aircrew and liaison officer roles, including working for NATO in the Combined Air Operations Center in Vicenza, Italy during the Bosnia-Herzegovina conflict. Captain Graciela Tiscareño-Sato served until her separation date in October 1999 after completing her master's degree in international business management and opting for a career change into tech marketing in Silicon Valley. As an active veteran, mother of three, she has won six international book awards for her bilingual Captain Mama children's book which she shares with school children and teachers from coast-to-coast. Her Captain Mama books are the first children's books in Spanish and English featuring women flying military airplanes.

In April 2003, Brigadier General Ricardo Aponte became the Deputy Director for Operations, Headquarters United States Southern Command in Miami, Florida. In October 2004, he was named Director, J-7, of the United States Southern Command. His directorate is the focal point for transformation initiatives, knowledge management, experimentation and gaming within the U. S. Southern Command. The directorate seeks out new concepts and rigorously tests them both in simulation and as part of operational experiments. The first transformation initiative was the start-up of the Secretary of Defense mandated Standing Joint Force Headquarters (SJFHQ). The SJFHQ, consists of planning, operations, knowledge management, and information superiority experts who form the backbone of the Joint Task Force command structure in the event of contingency operations. Aponte retired July 1, 2007.

In August 1997, Antonio J. Ramos became the first Hispanic to serve as commander, Air Force Security Assistance Center, Air Force Materiel Command, and dual-hatted as Assistant to the Commander for International Affairs, Headquarters Air Force Materiel Command. Brigadier General Ramos retired from the Air Force on August 1, 1999.

== Air Force Combat Action Medal ==
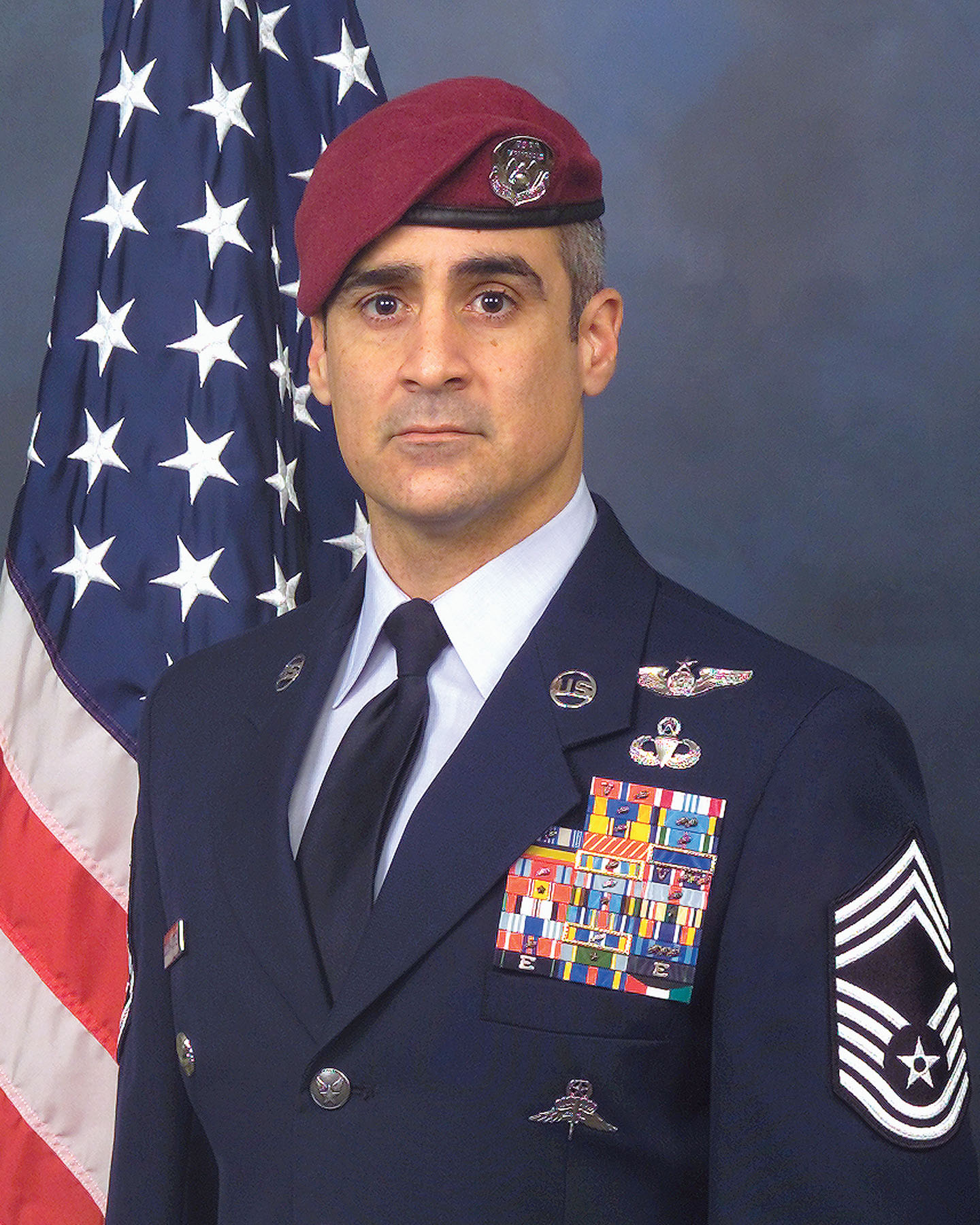
Chief Master Sergeant Ramón Colón-López

Chief Master Sergeant Ramón Colón-López is pararescueman who on June 13, 2007, became the first Hispanic, among the first six airmen, to be awarded the newly created Air Force Combat Action Medal, bestowed upon him by Air Force Chief of Staff General Teed Michael Moseley at the Air Force Memorial, in Washington, DC. The medal was created to recognize Air Force members who are engaged in air or ground combat "outside the wire" in combat zones. Airmen who are under direct and hostile fire, or who personally engaged hostile forces with direct and lethal fire are eligible to receive the award. On March 11, 2004, Colón-López together with his Advance Force Operations Team and elements of the Afghan National Strike Unit, participated in an operation which required the capture of a high level target and a follow-on site exploitation with the intention of preventing the proliferation of chemical weapons. His helicopter came upon hostile enemy fire, however Colón-López continued on his mission which resulted in the capture of 10 of the enemy and the destruction of multiple rocker propelled grenades and small caliber weapons. In January 2005, after Colón-López returned to the United States, he was named Superintendent of Training and later Commandant of the Pararescue and Combat Rescue Officer School.

== National Hispanic Heritage Week ==
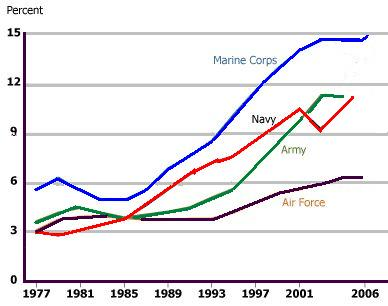
Trend of Hispanic enlistment (Source: Department of Defense, Population Representation in the Military Services, Fiscal Year 2004; and data provided by the Office of the Deputy Under Secretary of Defense).

On September 17, 1968, President Lyndon B. Johnson designated a week in mid-September as National Hispanic Heritage Week. In 1988, President Ronald Reagan extended that week to a month-long observance. The National Hispanic Heritage Month is a time for Americans to educate themselves about the influences Hispanic culture has had on society. The Air Force has realized that the fastest growing group in both the United States and the Marines are Hispanics, and have joined the rest of the United States in the celebration of the contributions which Hispanics in the United Air Force have made to that military institution by celebrating National Hispanic Heritage Month from September 15 through October 15.

However, the number of Hispanics in the Air Force do not represent their percentage of the population. Today the United States Department of Defense faces a nationwide problem in recruiting men for the all volunteer Armed Forces because of the war in Iraq and Afghanistan, yet according to the data provided by the Office of the Deputy Under Secretary of Defense, Hispanic recruiting numbers have not increased into that service. Compared with the United States Marine Corps where Hispanics comprise 18 percent of the enlisted personnel, the Air Force Hispanics only comprise 4.9 percent of the enlisted men.

== See also ==
- Hispanics in the United States Marine Corps
- Hispanics in the United States Navy
- Hispanics in the United States Coast Guard
- Hispanic Americans in World War II
- Hispanics in the American Civil War
