= José M. Portela =

United States Air Force general

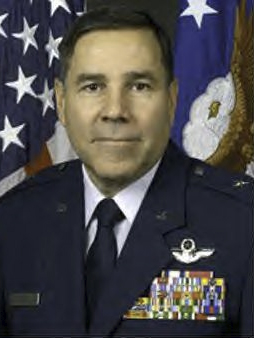
- Brigadier General José M. Portela; Youngest C-141 Starlifter aircraft commander and captain. Also the only reservist ever to serve as director of mobility forces for Bosnia.
- Born: June 16, 1949 (age 77); San Juan, Puerto Rico
- Military career
- Allegiance: United States of America
- Branch: Air Force Reserve; United States Air Force; Puerto Rico Air National Guard (2005–2006 and 2009–2012)
- Service years: 1969–2012
- Rank: Brigadier General
- Commands: Puerto Rico Air National Guard
- Conflicts: Vietnam War; Operation Just Cause; Gulf War; Operation Desert Shield; Operation Desert Storm
- Awards: Air Force Distinguished Service Medal with one oak leaf cluster Legion of Merit; Distinguished Flying Cross; Meritorious Service Medal with three oak leaf clusters

Brigadier General José M. Portela (born June 16, 1949) is a retired officer of the United States Air Force who recently retired from the position of assistant adjutant general for Air, which he held while also serving as commander of the Puerto Rico Air National Guard. In 1972, Portela became the youngest C-141 Starlifter aircraft commander and captain at age 22. Portela is also the only reservist ever to serve as director of mobility forces for Bosnia. He is also the first native of Puerto Rico to hold the rank of Brigadier General in the United States Air Force Reserve.

== Early years ==
Portela was born on June 16, 1949, and raised in San Juan, Puerto Rico, where he received his primary and secondary education. He enrolled in the University of Puerto Rico after he graduated from high school and earned a Bachelor of Arts degree in business administration in 1969 at the age of 19.

== Military career ==
Portela joined the United States Air Force Reserves and was commissioned a Second Lieutenant through the Air Force Reserve Officer Training Corps while still 19 years of age. In June 1969 he received his undergraduate pilot training at Webb Air Force Base in Texas and earned his pilot wings in June 1970. Promoted to first lieutenant, he was assigned to the 41st Military Airlift Squadron at Charleston AFB, S.C. and flew C-141A Starlifter during which time he became the youngest C-141A aircraft commander at age 22. On June 8, 1972, he was promoted to captain and, in September 1972, served with the 3rd Airlift Squadron which briefly operated the new Lockheed C-5A Galaxy at Charleston Air Force Base, South Carolina. B. General Portela served at CAFB, S.C. until July 1973, when he joined the Air Force Reserves as a C-5A Initial Cadre pilot with the 312th Airlift Squadron at Travis Air Force Base, California.

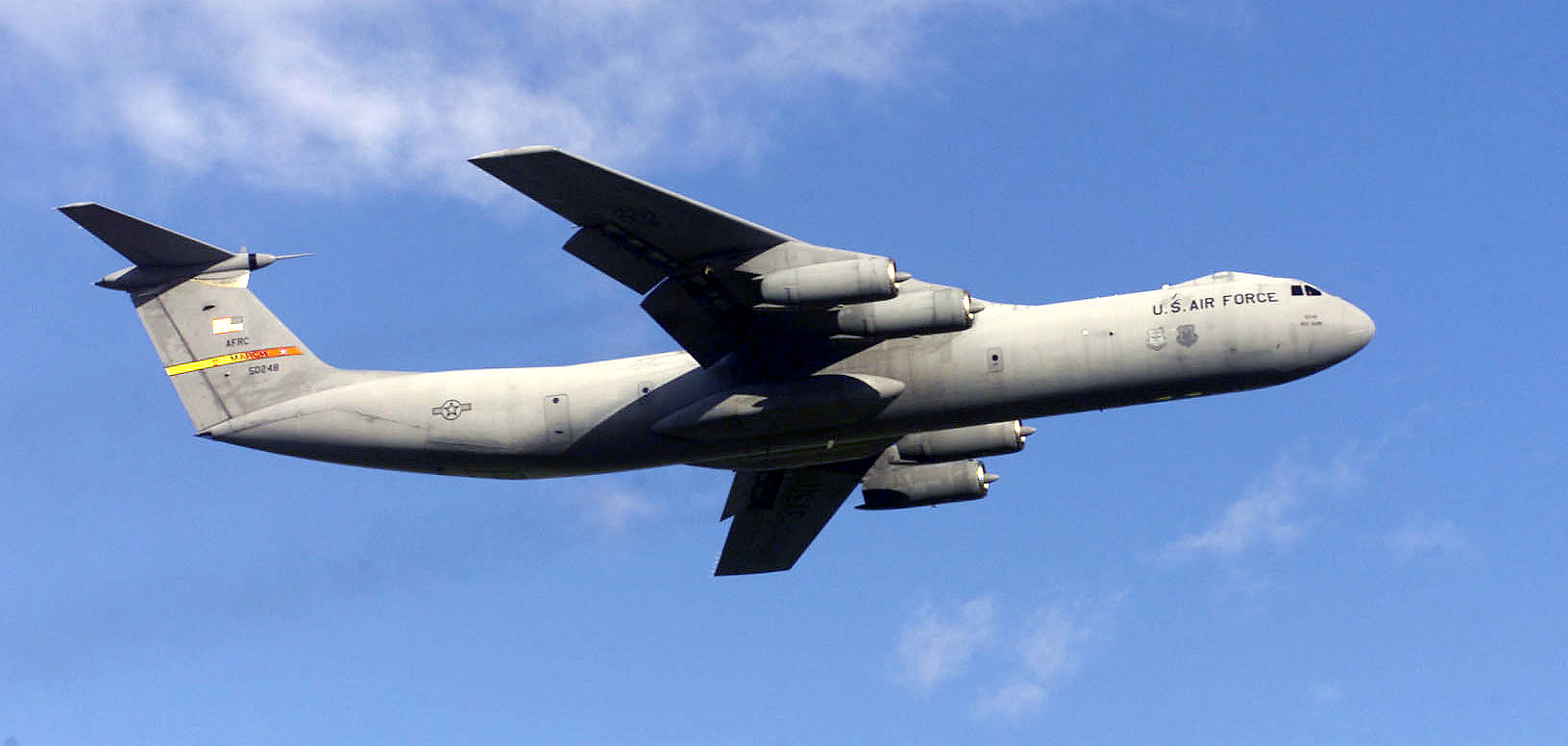
Type of C-141 Starlifter which Portela commanded at age 22

He served in a variety of flying, command and staff positions from November 1982 to November 1984, during which time he was promoted to the rank of major (June 8, 1983) and served as a C-5 flight examiner, 326th Military Airlift Squadron at Dover Air Force Base in Dover, Delaware. In 1984, Portela took the Marine Command and Staff War Course and was reassigned to the 433rd Airlift Wing at Kelly Air Force Base, Texas, where he served as a C-5 standardization/evaluation chief and airlift control flight commander until June 1992, he was promoted to lieutenant colonel on June 17, 1987. During this timeframe he completed the National Security Management Course at the National Defense University.

From June 1992 to August 1995, Portela served in the following positions at Headquarters: United States Air Force in the Pentagon in Washington, D.C.p; Individual mobilization augmentee, VJ3, United States Southern Command and Latin American affairs political/military officer (XOXXW) (June 1992 -October 1992); Individual mobilization augmentee, VJ3, United States Southern Command and plans and issues officer (XOXX) (October 1992 -June 1993) and Individual mobilization augmentee to the chief, Mobility Forces Division (XOFM) (June 1993 -August 1995). He was promoted to colonel on July 1, 1992. During this time frame, Portela attended the following courses: Joint Warfare Operations Course (1993) and National Security and Decision Making, Strategy and Policy Courses (1995) at the Naval War College and the Reserve Components National Security Course (1994) at the National War College.

From August 1995 to July 2004, Portela served in the following positions: vice commander and inspector general, 512th Airlift Wing, Dover Air Force Base (1995–1998); vice commander, 22nd Air Force, (1998–2000), during which he was promoted to Brigadier General (June 30, 1999) and as mobilization assistant to the vice commander (2000–2003) at Dobbins Air Reserve Base, Georgia. He served as mobilization assistant to the undersecretary of the Air Force for Manpower and Reserve Affairs, at the Pentagon at Washington, DC. from January 2003 to July 2004 before being assigned Assistant Adjutant General for Air also serving as Commander of the Puerto Rico Air National Guard, San Juan, P.R., position in which he served from January 11, 2005, to November 7, 2006.

As command pilot, Portela has flown the following military aircraft: T-37, T-38, C-141 and C-5, plus he has more than 5,000 flight hours to his credit. Besides the Vietnam War, he also participated in the following military operations: The Persian Gulf War, Operation Just Cause in Panama and Operation Desert Shield/Storm and has been the only reservist ever to serve as director of mobility forces for Bosnia.

== Civilian occupation ==
Portela has flown Douglas DC-8s, Boeing 747, 737 and 727s, Airbus A319, A320, A321 and A330s, and Fokker 100s. He retired in June 2014 as an Airbus 330 check captain for U.S. Airways with over 25,000 hours. Portela, who has also served as a safety and glass cockpit expert for the Airline Pilots Association, is the recipient of the Airline Pilots Association (ALPA) Superior Airmanship Plaque, given for "demonstrating extraordinary flying skills and professionalism in the face of adversity, for safely recovering an aircraft with severe flight control problems, exemplifying the best of what a pilot can offer to those who have placed their lives in his hands." Portela, who is also a chapter founder of League of United Latin American Citizens and co-chairman of the Defense Advisory Council on Hispanic Issues, he has also been Honored numerous times by the Senate and House of Representatives of Puerto Rico for "Outstanding Achievements". Portela, currently resides in Dallas, Texas, with his family.

== Military decorations and awards ==
Among Brigadier General Portela's many military decorations are the following:

Command Pilot Badge
Headquarters Air Force badge

- Air Force Distinguished Service Medal with one oak leaf cluster
- Legion of Merit with one oak leaf cluster
- Meritorious Service Medal with three oak leaf clusters
- Air Force Achievement Medal
- Joint Service Commendation Medal
- Joint Meritorious Unit Award
- Air Force Commendation Medal with two oak leaf clusters
- Combat Readiness Medal with seven oak leaf clusters
- Vietnam Service Medal with three bronze service stars
- National Defense Service Medal with oak leaf cluster
- Armed Forces Service Medal
- Humanitarian Service Medal
- Southwest Asia Service Medal with service star
- Air Force Longevity Service Award
- Armed Forces Reserve Medal
- Small Arms Expert Marksmanship Ribbon
- Air Force Training Ribbon
- Vietnam Campaign Medal
- Vietnam Cross of Gallantry with Emblem with Palm and Frame
- Kuwait Liberation Medal (Saudi Arabia)
- Kuwait Liberation Medal (Kuwait)

== Effective dates of promotion ==
Rank	Date
Second Lieutenant	June 8, 1969
First Lieutenant	December 8, 1970
Captain	June 8, 1972
Major	June 8, 1983
Lieutenant Colonel	June 17, 1987
Colonel	July 1, 1992
Brigadier General	June 30, 1999

== See also ==
- List of Puerto Ricans
- Puerto Rico Air National Guard
- List of Puerto Rican military personnel
- Hispanics in the United States Air Force
