= Antonio J. Ramos =

United States Air Force general

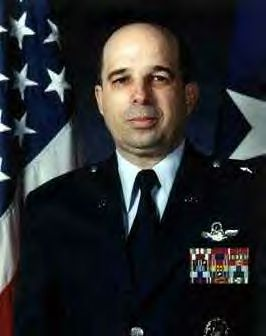
- Brigadier General Antonio J. Ramos
- Born: 1947 (age 78–79); San Juan, Puerto Rico
- Military career
- Allegiance: United States of America
- Branch: United States Air Force
- Service years: 1969-1999
- Rank: Brigadier General
- Conflicts: Vietnam War
- Awards: Defense Superior Service Medal with oak leaf cluster Legion of Merit; Bronze Star; Meritorious Service Medal with three oak leaf clusters Air Medal

Brigadier General Antonio J. Ramos (born 1946) was an officer of the United States Air Force. He was the first Hispanic to serve as commander, Air Force Security Assistance Center, Air Force Materiel Command, and dual-hatted as Assistant to the Commander for International Affairs, Headquarters Air Force Materiel Command.

== Early years ==
In 1969, Ramos was commissioned as a distinguished graduate of the University of Puerto Rico's Reserve Officer Training Corps program. He received his academic education in the University of Puerto Rico where he earned a Bachelor of Arts degree in political science in 1968 and a master's degree in education, Southern Illinois University, Edwardsville in 1975.

== Early military career ==
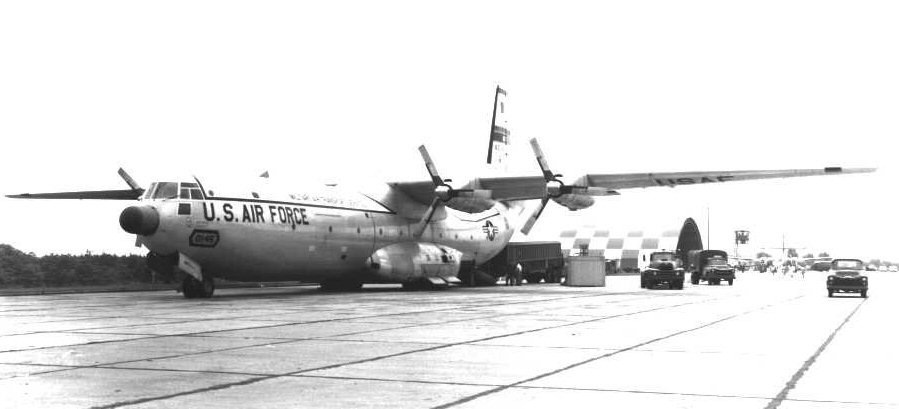
C-133 Cargomaster Type of aircraft flown by Ramos

Ramos was sent to Vance Air Force Base in Oklahoma where he completed his undergraduate pilot training in June 1970. He was then assigned as a C-133 pilot with the 84th Military Airlift Squadron, Travis Air Force Base, California. In August 1971 Ramos was reassigned to England Air Force Base, to attend C-123K pilot training. He graduated in November 1971 and was transferred to 310th Tactical Airlift Squadron, Phan Rang Air Base and Tan Son Nhut Air Base, South Vietnam. In August 1972 was transferred to U-Tapao Royal Thai Naval Airfield in Thailand where he was the Base Operations Officer until November 1972.

== Return to the United States ==
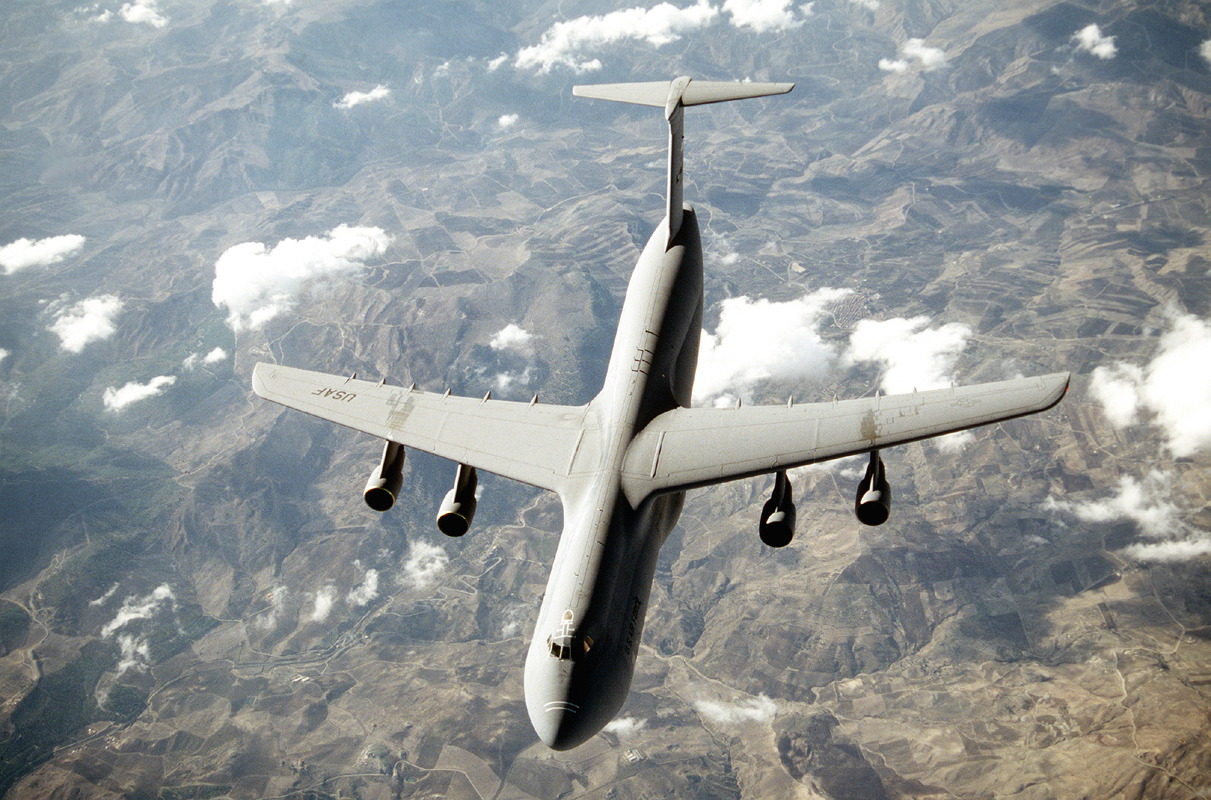
C-5 Galaxy Type of aircraft flown by Ramos

In December 1972, Ramos returned to the United States upon completing his tour of duty in Vietnam and Thailand. He was assigned to Altus Air Force Base in Oklahoma to be attend C-5 Galaxy pilot training. In February 1973 he transferred to the 3rd Military Airlift Squadron, in Charleston Air Force Base, South Carolina until August 1973. He was then transferred to Dover Air Force Base, Delaware where he was a pilot and aircraft commander, instructor pilot, and flight examiner for the 3rd Military Airlift Squadron. During this time Ramos attained a master's degree in education from Southern Illinois University and attended Squadron Officer School in Maxwell Air Force Base, Alabama.

In July 1978 he became the Wing Flight Examiner for the 436th Military Airlift Wing, at Dover Air Force Base. After serving for five and a half years at Dover AFB he was transferred to Headquarters Air Mobility Command in Scott Air Force Base in February 1979 to be the Standardization and Evaluation pilot, Chief, Strategic Airlift Manning Section, and Chief, Air Crew Manning Branch.

After his headquarters assignment Ramos attended the Air Command and Staff College at Maxwell Air Force Base in Alabama from August 1982 until graduating in June 1983. He then continued on to Altus Air Force Base, Oklahoma to be the Operations Officer for the 56th Military Airlift Squadron. In June 1985 Ramos was transferred to Travis Air Force Base, California to take command of the 75th Military Airlift Squadron, where he served as Squadron Commander until July 1987.

In August 1987, Ramos attended the Inter-American Defense College in Fort Lesley J. McNair, Washington, D.C. In July 1988 he would start a series of assignments with emphasis to the Western Hemisphere. He would become Chief, Caribbean Basin Branch, later, Chief, Western Hemisphere Division (J-5), for the Joint Staff, Washington, D.C. In August 1991 Ramos was transferred to U.S. Southern Command in Panama as the Director, Strategy, Policy and Plans (J-5). In August 1994, Ramos would return to Headquarters Air Mobility Command, Scott Air Force Base to be the Inspector General.

In December 1995, Ramos returned to U.S. Southern Command, Panama as Special Assistant to the Commander in Chief. In August 1997, Ramos would transfer to Headquarters Air Force Materiel Command at Wright-Patterson Air Force Base, Ohio for his final Air Force assignment as the Commander, Air Force Security Assistance Center and Assistant to the Commander for International Affairs, Headquarters Air Force Materiel Command. Brigadier General Ramos retired from the United States Air Force on August 1, 1999.

== Military awards ==
Among Brigadier General Antonio Ramos' decorations and medals were the following:

- Defense Superior Service Medal
- Legion of Merit
- Bronze Star
- Meritorious Service Medal with three oak leaf clusters
- Air Medal
- Joint Service Commendation Medal
- National Defense Service Medal with bronze service star,
- Armed Forces Expeditionary Medal with bronze service star,
- Air Force Overseas Long Tour Service Ribbon
- Air Force Overseas Short Tour Service Ribbon
- Small Arms Expert Marksmanship Ribbon
- Air Force Training Ribbon
- Vietnam Service Medal with bronze service star
- Vietnam Gallantry Cross with Palm Streamer
- Vietnam Campaign Medal

Badges:

- Command pilot
- Office of the Joint Chiefs of Staff Identification Badge

== See also ==
- List of Puerto Ricans
- List of Puerto Rican military personnel
- Hispanics in the United States Air Force
